= Outline of Munich =

Overview of and topical guide to Munich

Flag of Munich

Coat of arms of Munich

The following outline is provided as an overview of and topical guide to Munich:

Munich – capital and the most populated city in the German state of Bavaria. With over 1,450,000 residents in 310.43 km^{2} (119.86 sq mi) it is also Germany's third most populated Großstadt. Munich is considered a global city as of 2015, one of the most prosperous and fastest growing cities in Germany.

== General reference ==
- Pronunciation: /ˈmjuːnɪk/ MEW-nik; German: München [ˈmʏnçn̩]; Bavarian: Minga [ˈmɪŋ(ː)ɐ]
- Common English name(s): Munich
- Official English name(s): Munich
- Adjectival(s): Münchner
- Demonym(s): Münchner

== Geography of Munich ==
Geography of Munich

- Munich is:
  - a city
    - capital of Bavaria
- Population of Munich: 1,512,491
- Area of Munich: 310.43 km^{2} (119.86 sq mi)
- Atlas of Munich

Munich München
- Location within Germany
- Coordinates: 48°08′N 11°34′E

=== Location of Munich ===
- Munich is situated within the following regions:
  - Northern Hemisphere and Eastern Hemisphere
    - Eurasia
      - Europe (outline)
        - Central Europe
          - Germany
            - Bavaria
              - Upper Bavaria
                - Munich Metropolitan Region
- Time zone(s): Central European Time (UTC+01), Central European Summer Time (UTC+02)

=== Environment of Munich ===
- Climate of Munich

==== Natural geographic features of Munich ====
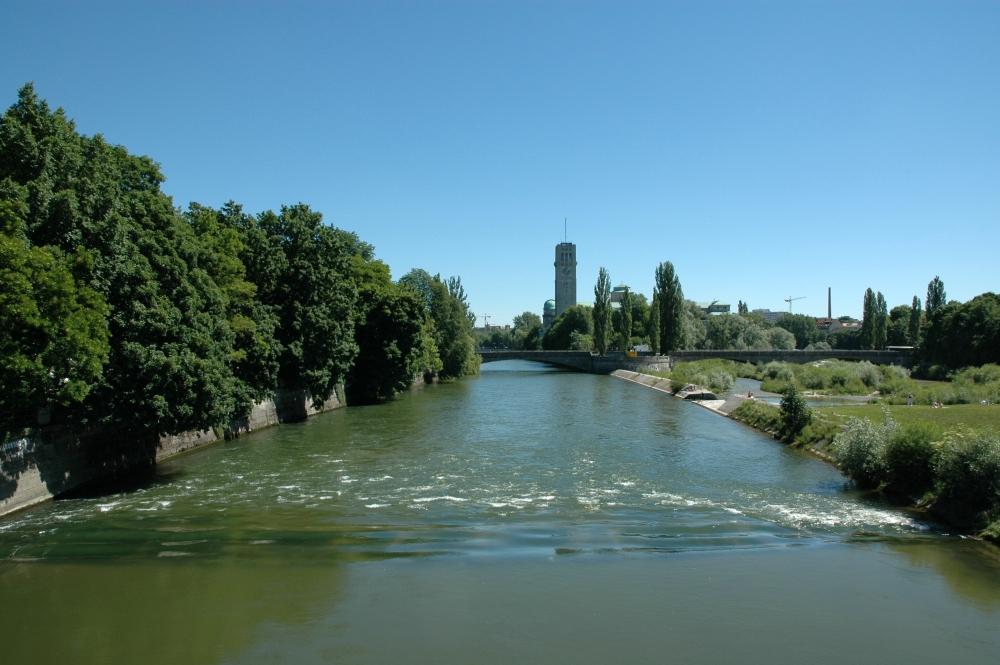
The river Isar in Munich

- Hills in Munich
  - Luitpoldhügel
- Lakes in Munich
  - Nadisee
- Rivers in Munich
  - Isar
    - Eisbach
  - Würm

=== Areas of Munich ===
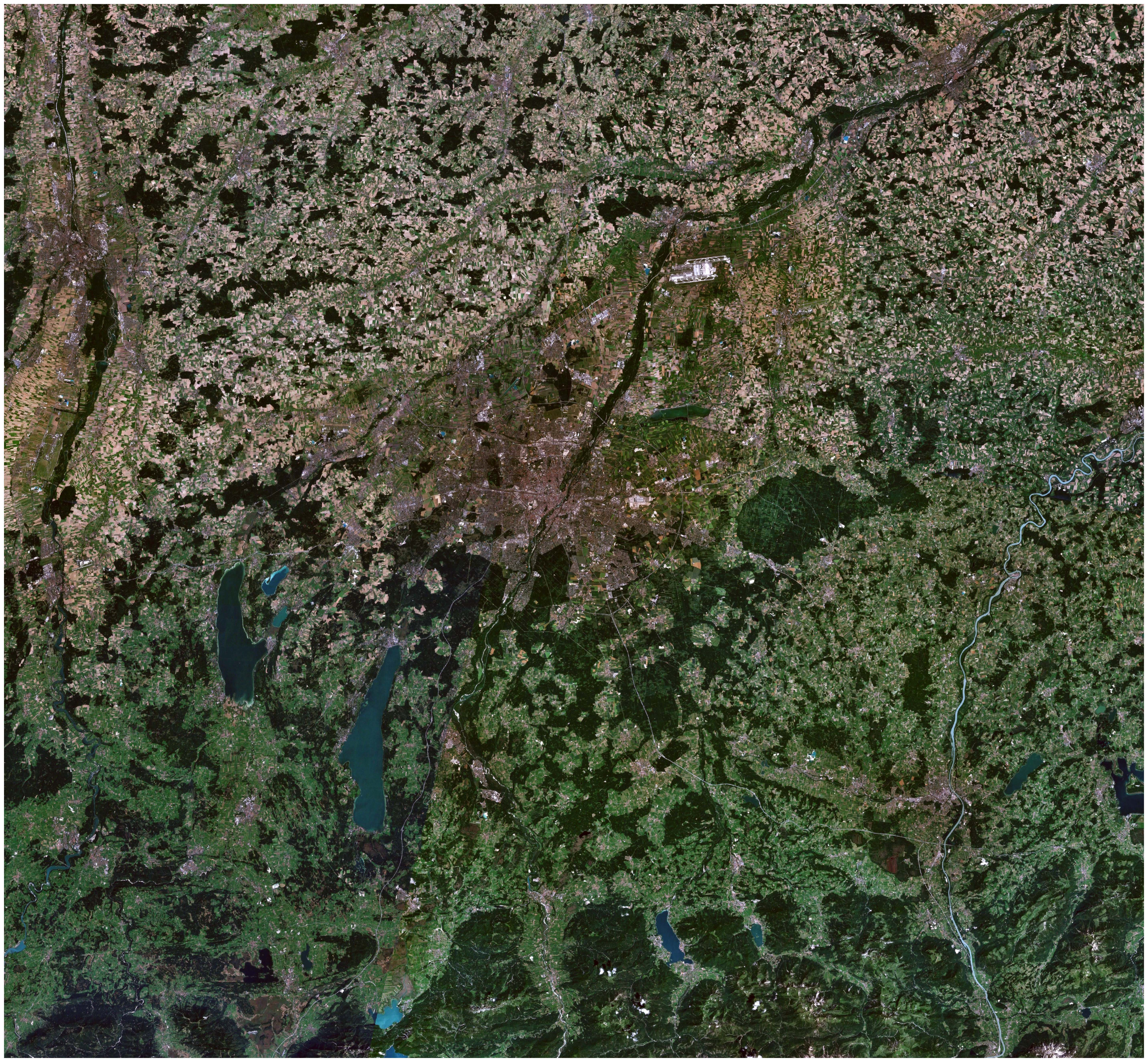
Satellite picture of the Munich Larger Urban Zone

Munich Metropolitan Region

- Larger Urban Zone
  - Stadt München
  - Landkreis Dachau
  - Landkreis Ebersberg
  - Landkreis Erding
  - Landkreis Freising
  - Landkreis Fürstenfeldbruck
  - Landkreis Landsberg am Lech
  - Landkreis München
  - Landkreis Starnberg

Boroughs of Munich

=== Locations in Munich ===
- Tourist attractions in Munich
  - Kunstareal
  - Shopping areas and markets

==== City gates of Munich ====
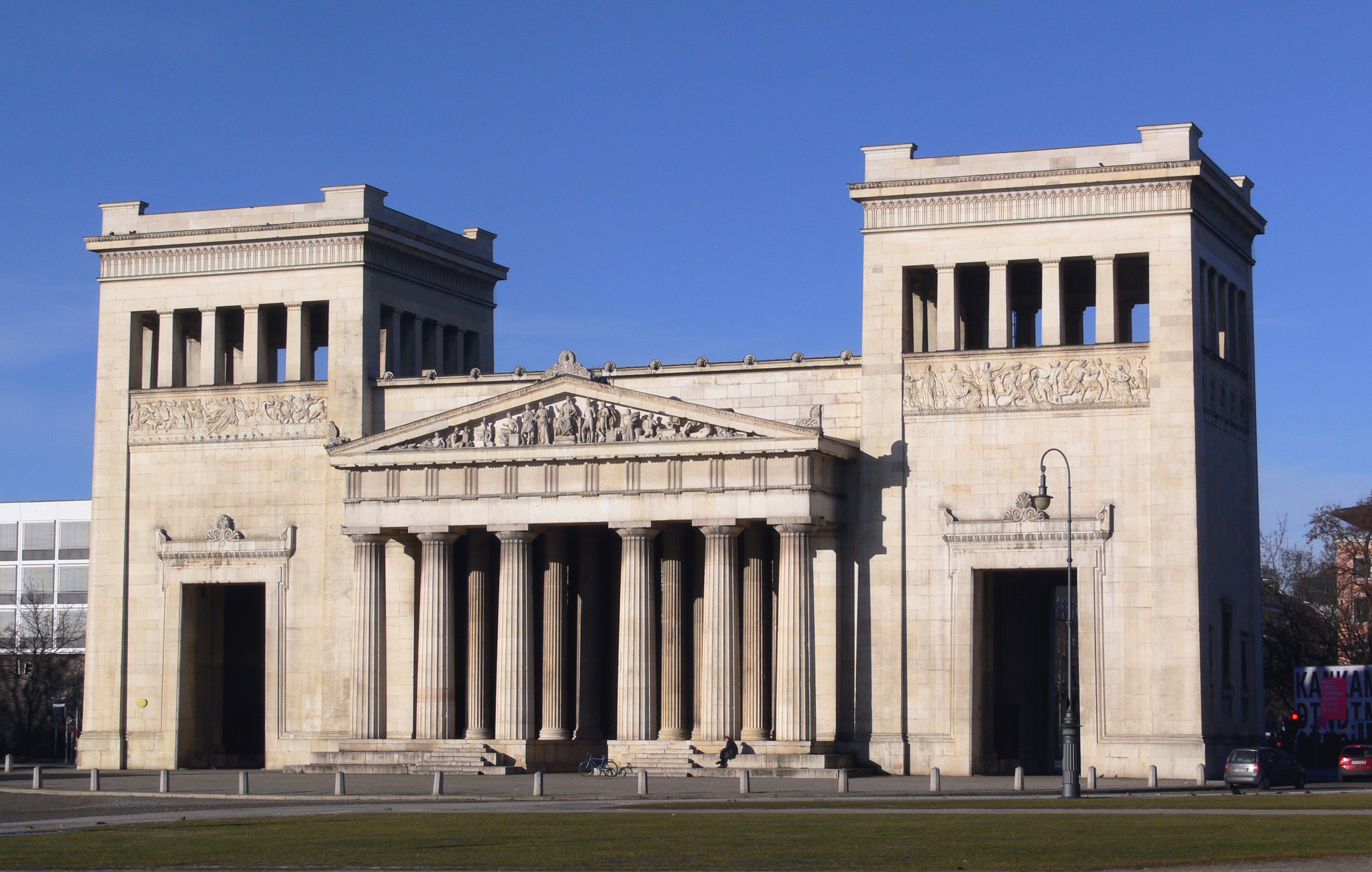
The Propylaea

- Isartor
- Karlstor
- Propylaea
- Sendlinger Tor

==== Cultural and exhibition centres in Munich ====
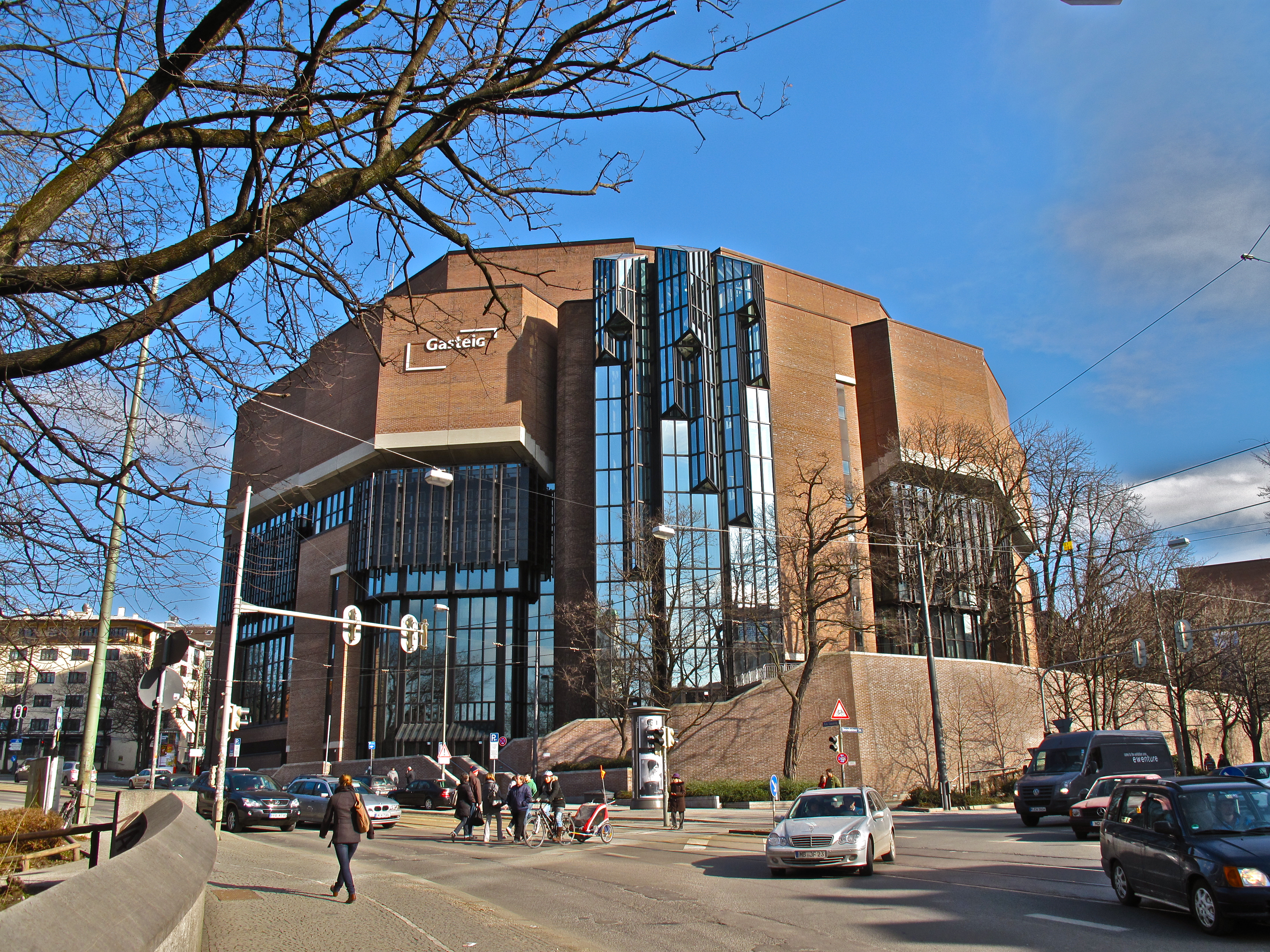
The Gasteig

- Alte Kongresshalle
- Gasteig
- Neue Messe München

==== Fountains in Munich ====
- Fischbrunnen
- Neptunbrunnen

==== Monuments and memorials in Munich ====
- Angel of Peace
- Ruhmeshalle
  - Bavaria statue

==== Museums and galleries in Munich ====
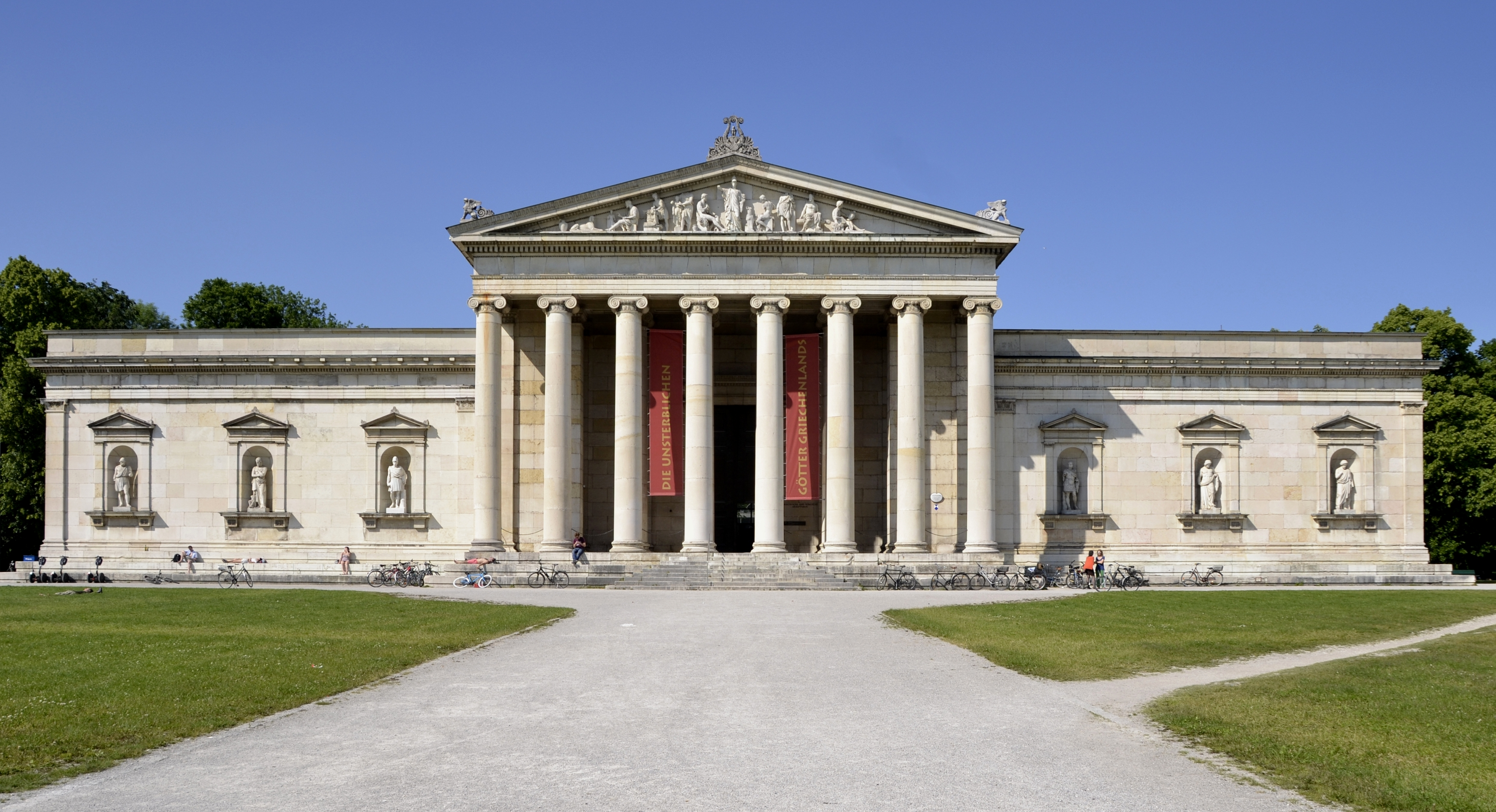
The Glyptothek

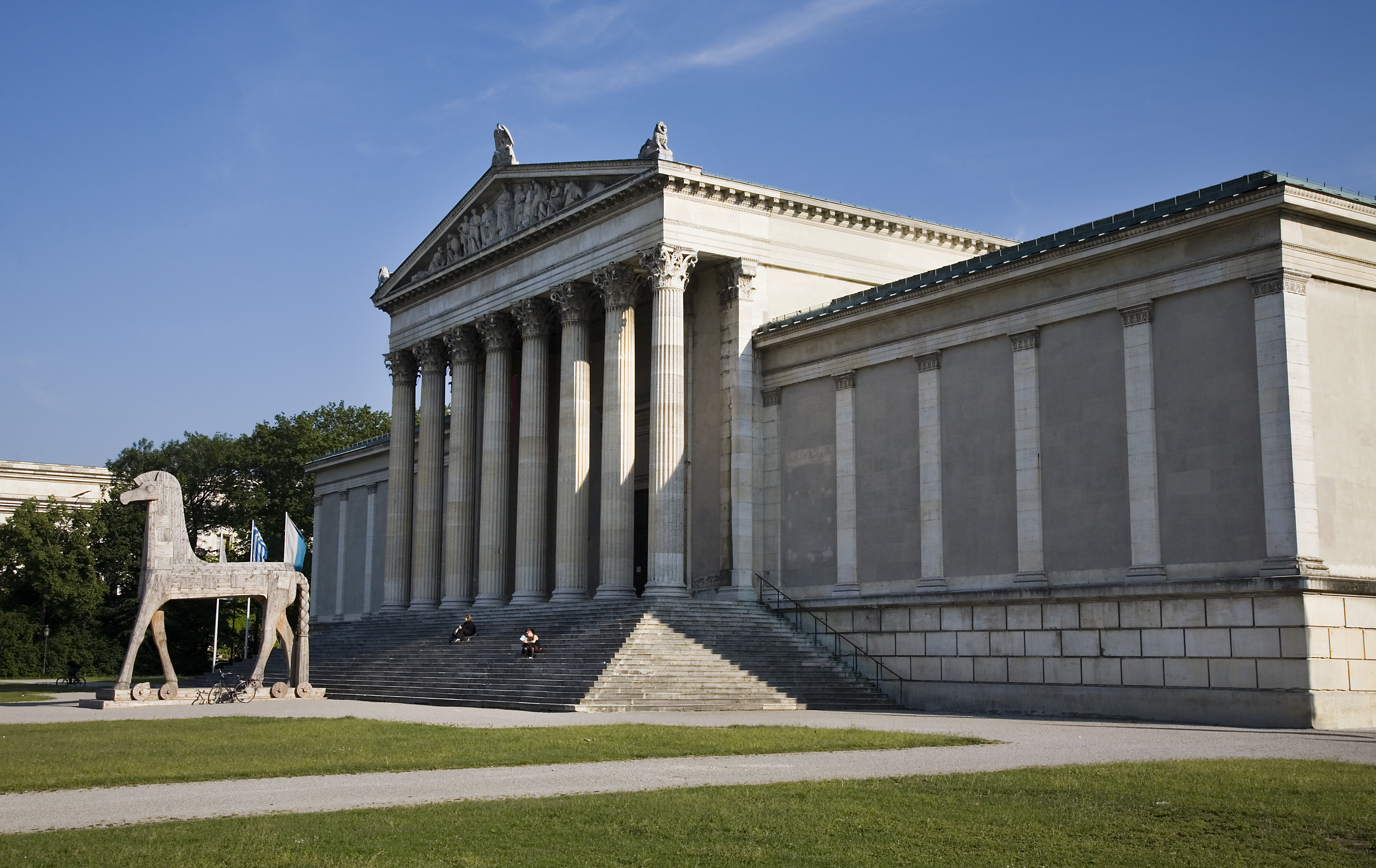
Bavarian State Collection of Antiques

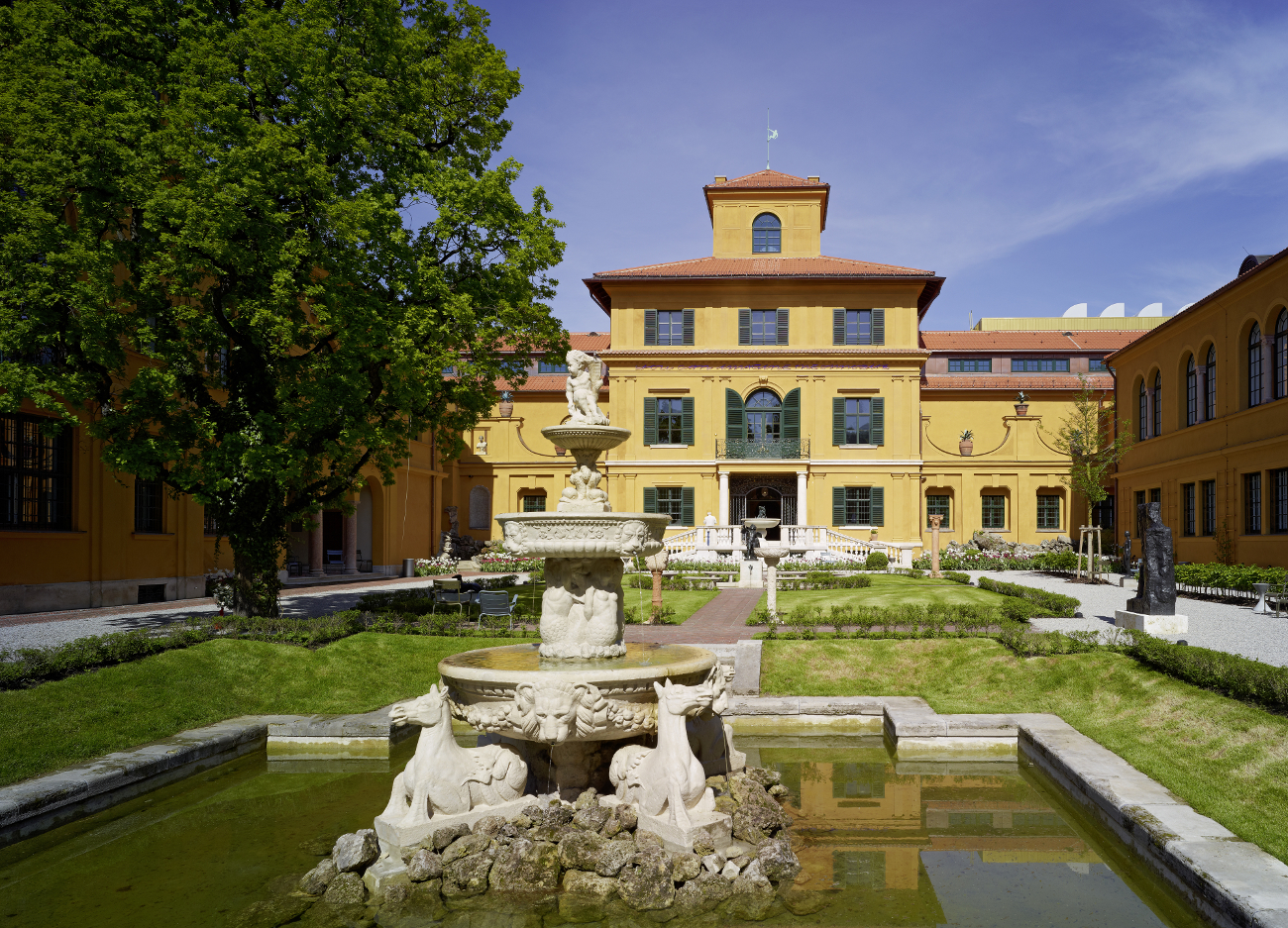
The Lenbachhaus

Museums in Munich

- Alte Pinakothek
- Bavarian National Museum
- Bavarian State Archaeological Collection
- BMW Museum
- BMW Welt
- Deutsches Museum
- Deutsches Theatermuseum
- Glyptothek
- Haus der Kunst
- Lenbachhaus
- Marstallmuseum
- Munich Stadtmuseum
- Museum Brandhorst
- Museum Five Continents
- Museum für Abgüsse Klassischer Bildwerke
- Museum Reich der Kristalle
- MVG Museum
- Neue Pinakothek
- Palaeontological Museum
- Pinakothek der Moderne
- Schackgalerie
- Staatliche Antikensammlungen
- Staatliche Graphische Sammlung München
- Staatliche Sammlung für Ägyptische Kunst

==== Palaces and villas in Munich ====
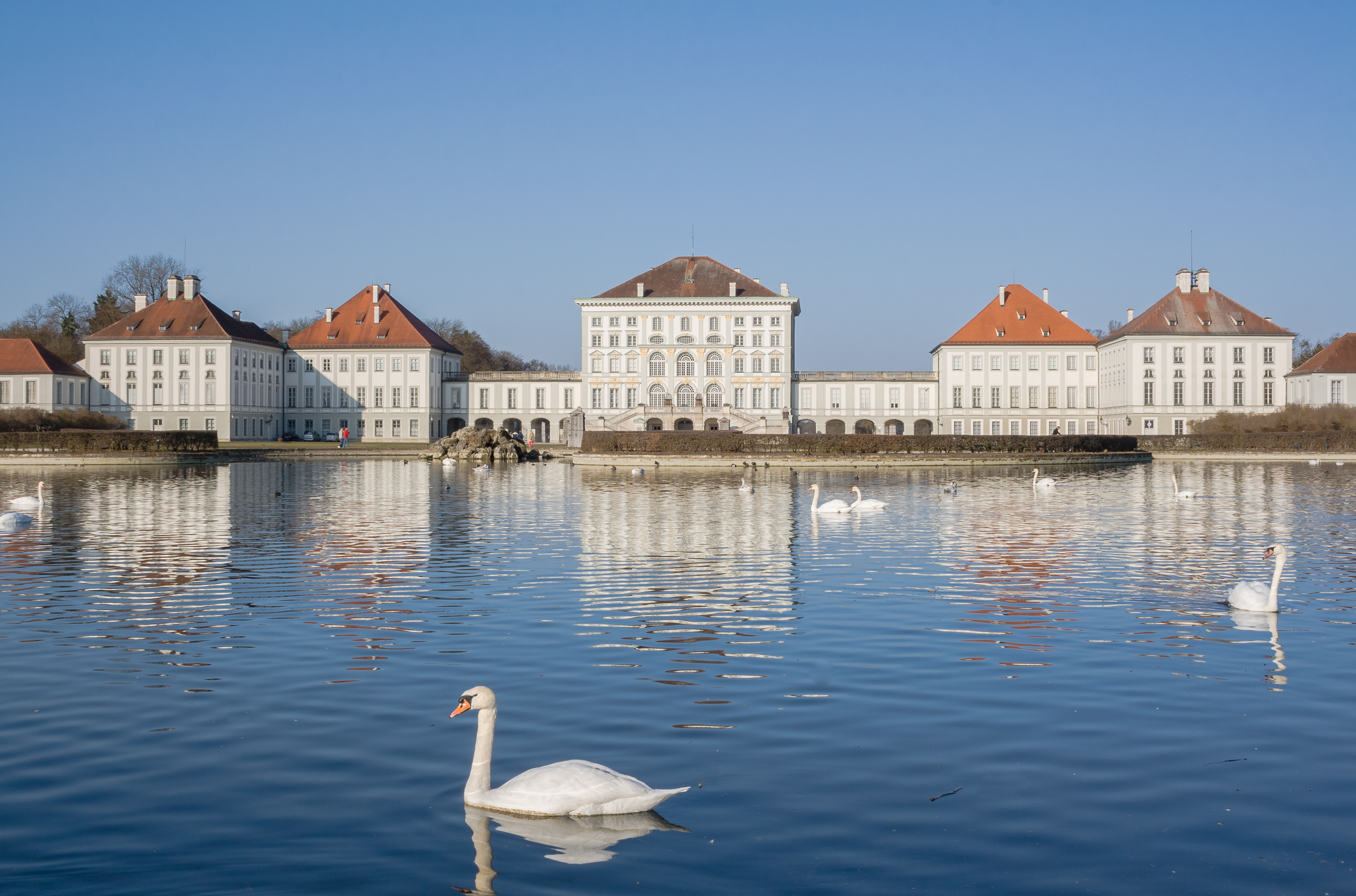
The Nymphenburg Palace

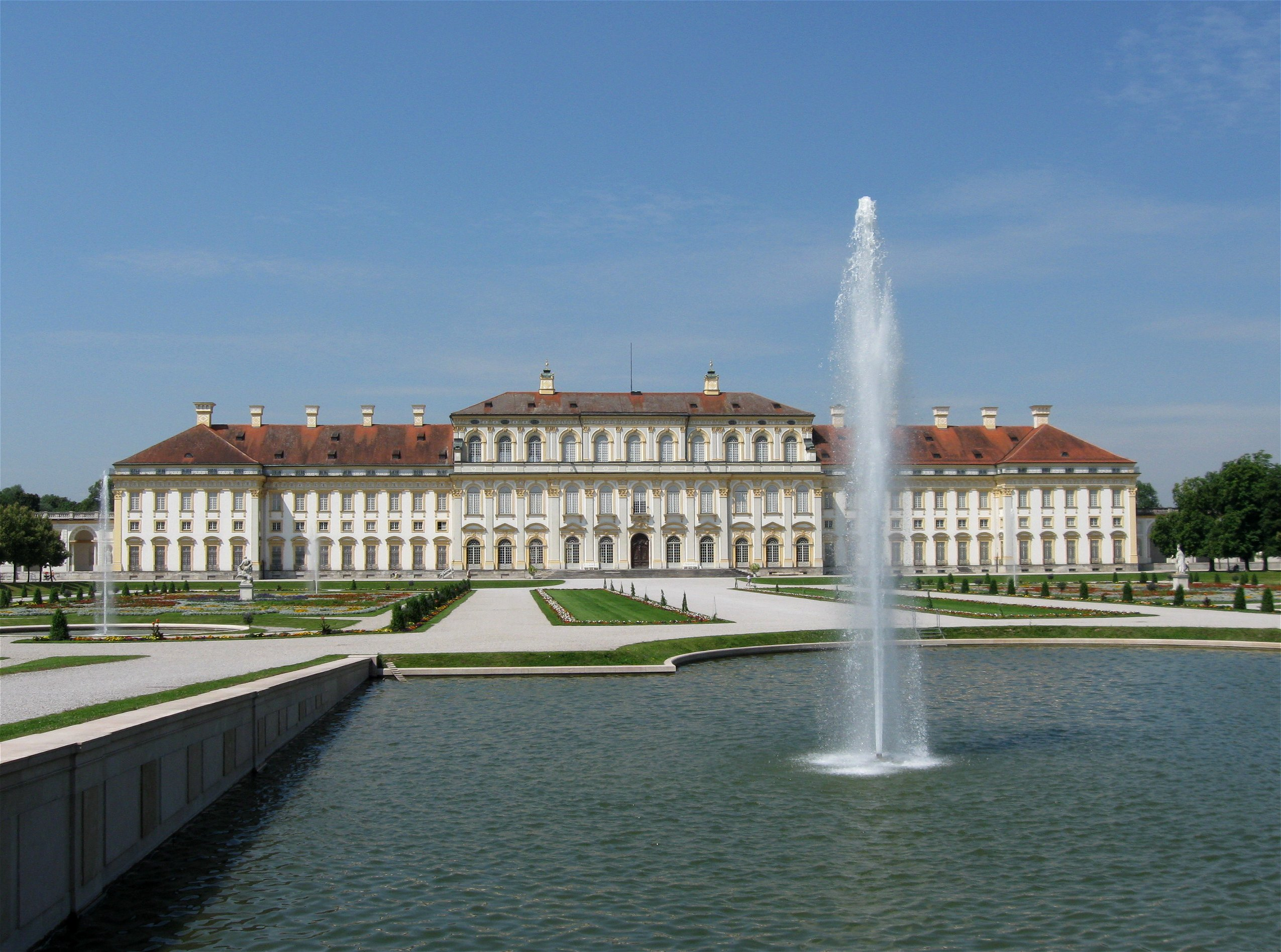
The Schleissheim Palace

- Alter Hof
- Amalienburg
- Blutenburg Castle
- Fürstenried Palace
- Holnstein Palace
- Munich Residenz
- Nymphenburg Palace
- Palais Leuchtenberg
- Palais Ludwig Ferdinand
- Palais Porcia
- Palais Preysing
- Prinz-Carl-Palais
- Schleissheim Palace
- Villa Stuck
- Villenkolonie Pasing I
- Wittelsbacher Palais

==== Parks and gardens in Munich ====
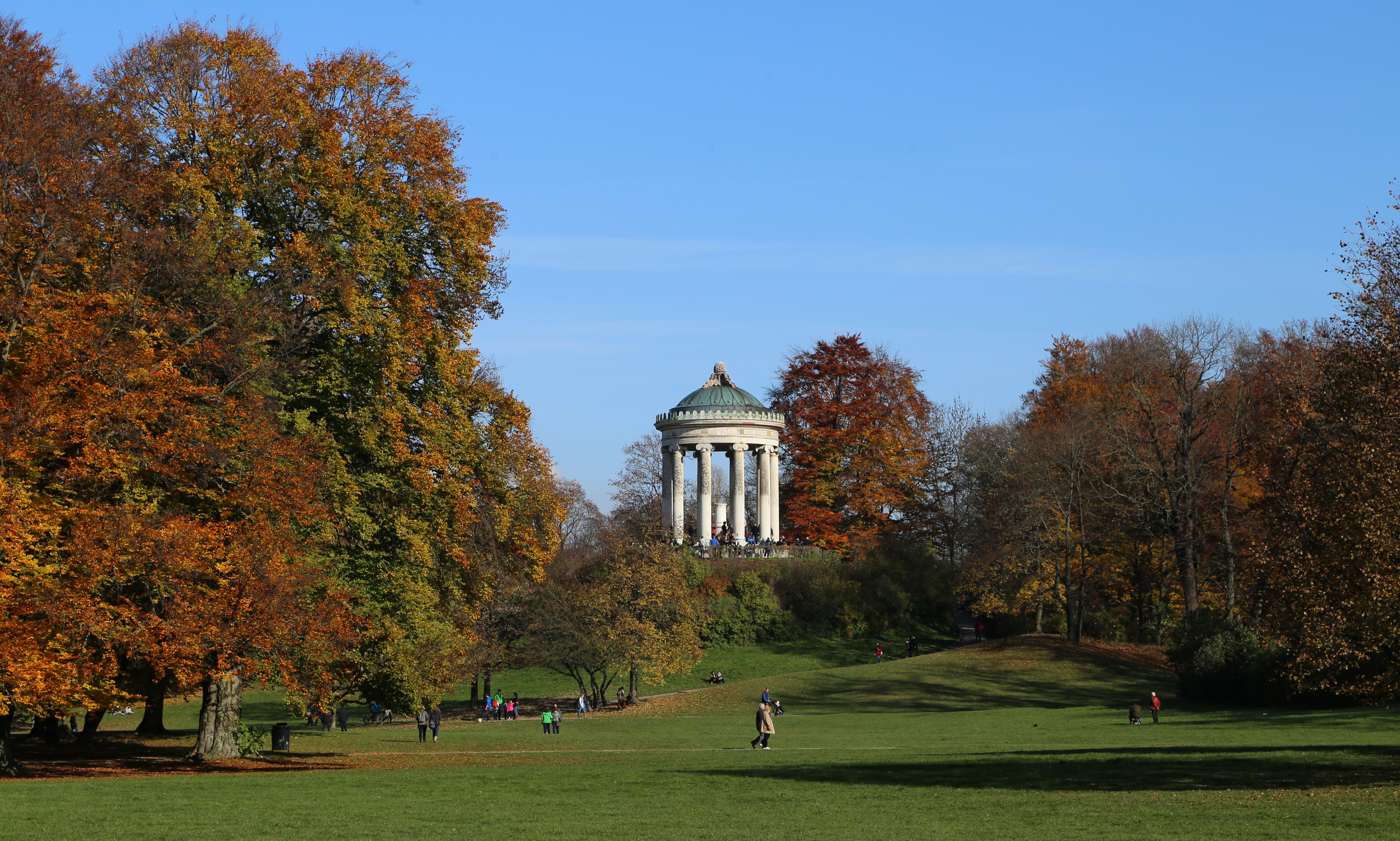
The Monopteros in the Englischer Garten

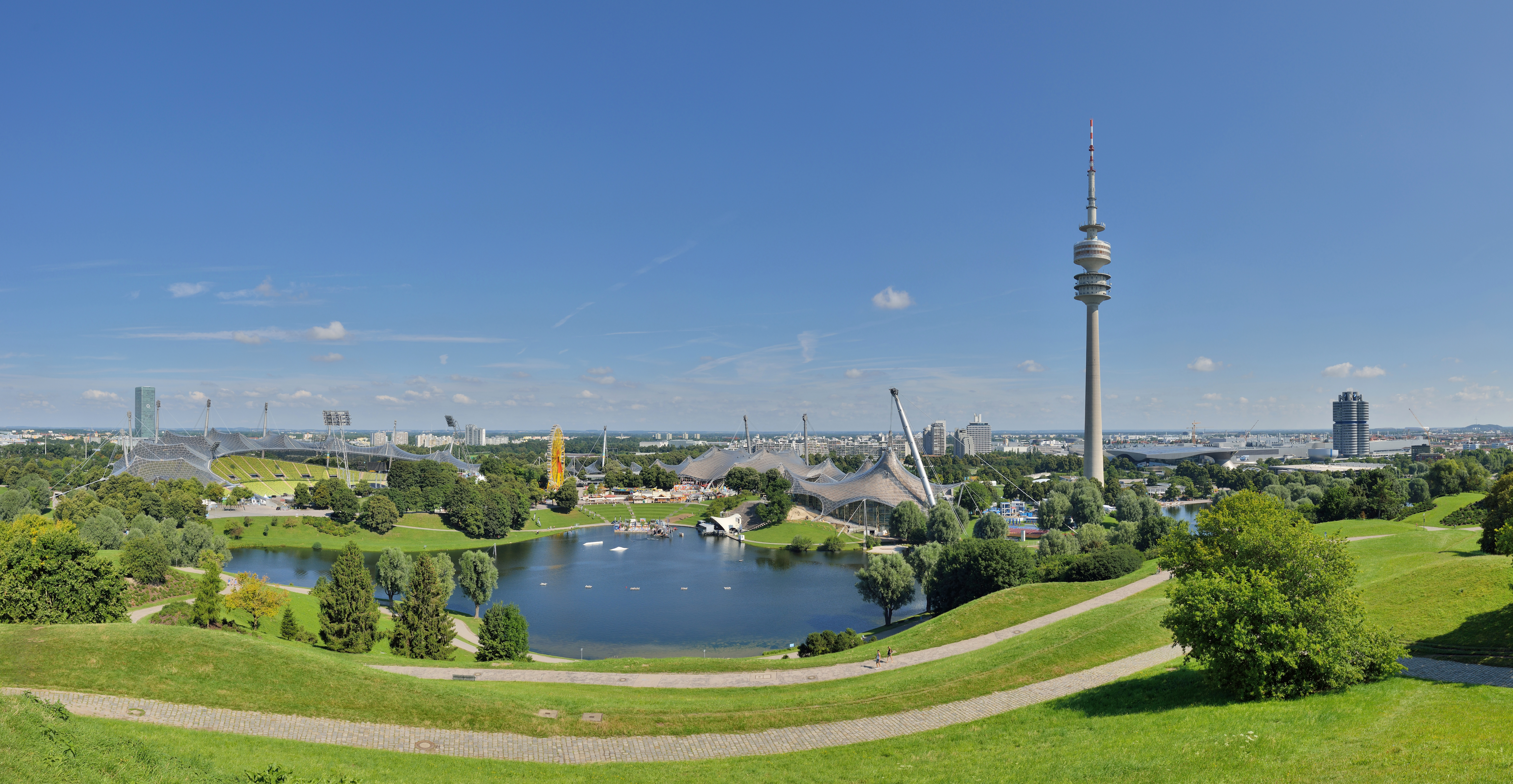
The Olympiapark

- Alter Botanischer Garten
- Botanischer Garten München-Nymphenburg
- Englischer Garten
- Hellabrunn Zoo
- Hofgarten
- Olympiapark
  - Olympiahalle
  - Olympiaturm
  - Olympic Village
- Ostpark
- Westpark
- Zamilapark

==== Public squares and open spaces in Munich ====
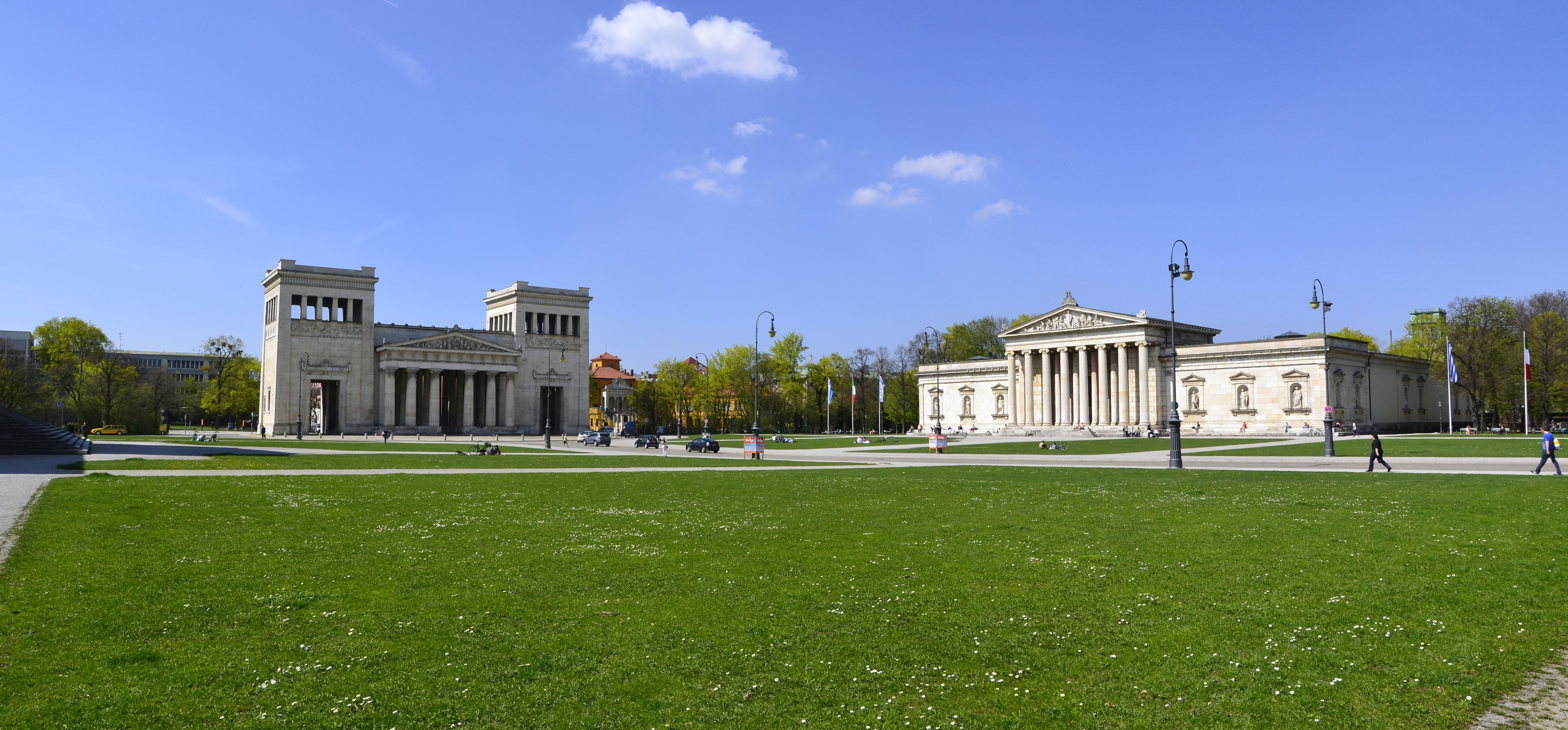
Königsplatz

- Karlsplatz
- Königsplatz
- Mariahilfplatz
- Marienplatz
- Max-Joseph-Platz
- Münchner Freiheit
- Odeonsplatz
- Panzerwiese
- Theresienwiese

==== Religious buildings in Munich ====
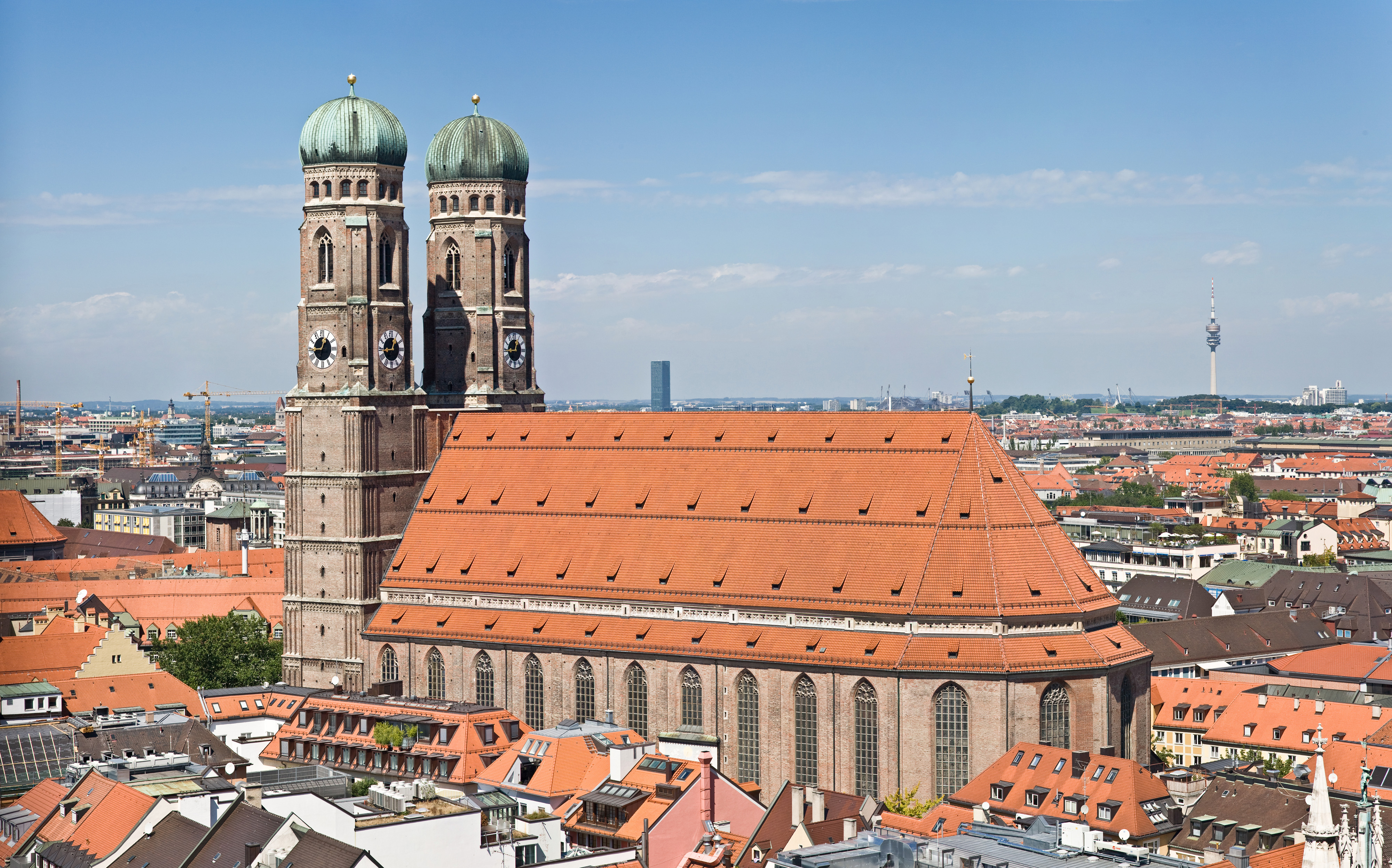
Munich Frauenkirche

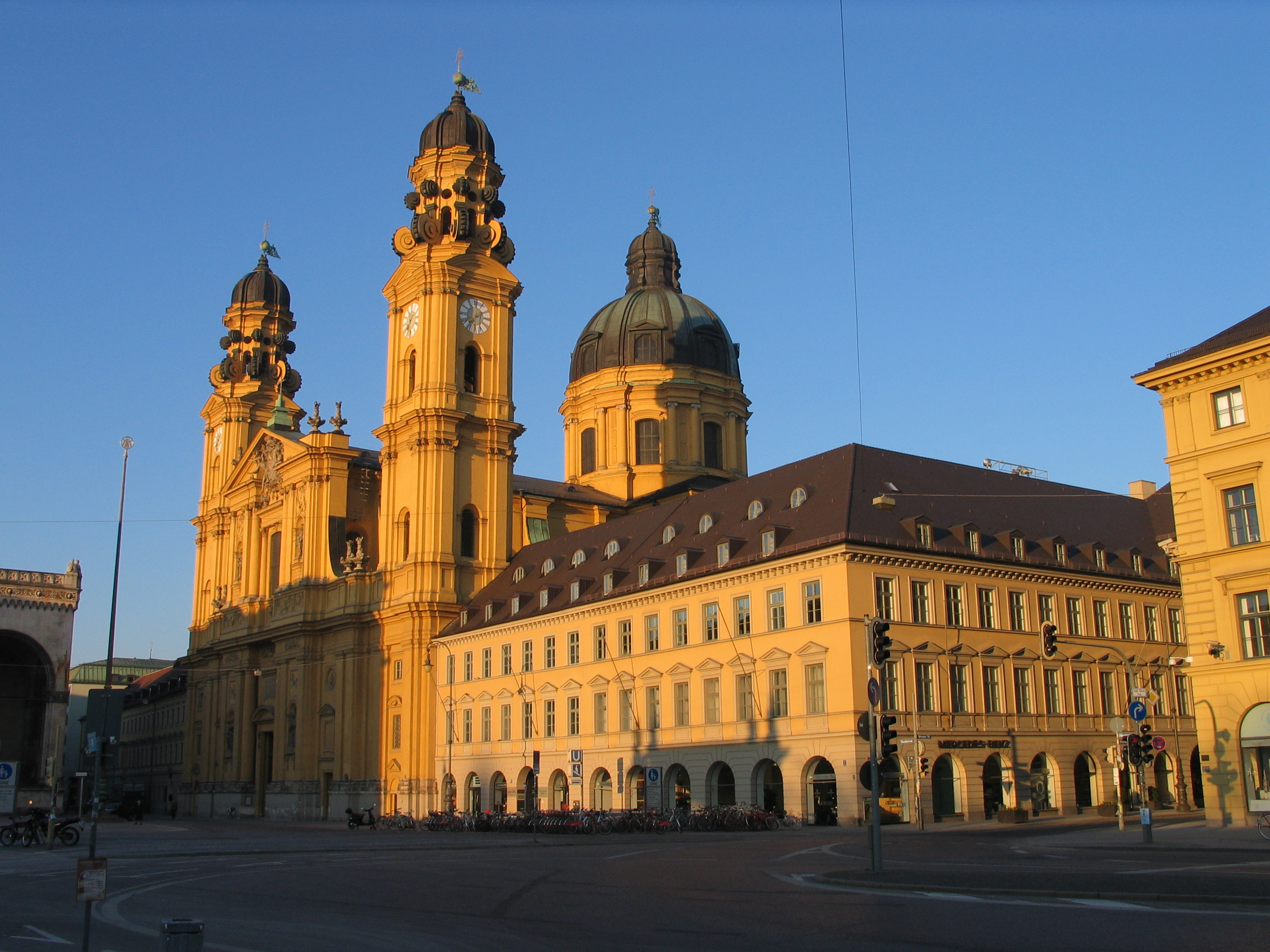
The Theatine Church

- Abbey Church of St Anna
- Allerheiligen-Hofkirche
- Asam Church
- Ludwigskirche
- Munich Frauenkirche, the cathedral
- New St John's Church
- Salvatorkirche
- St. Boniface's Abbey
- St. Luke's Church
- St. Martin, Moosach
- St. Michael in Berg am Laim
- St. Michael's Church
- St. Paul's Church
- St. Peter's Church
- St. Peter, Großhadern
- St. Sylvester, Schwabing
- Theatine Church
- Trinity Church

==== Secular buildings in Munich ====
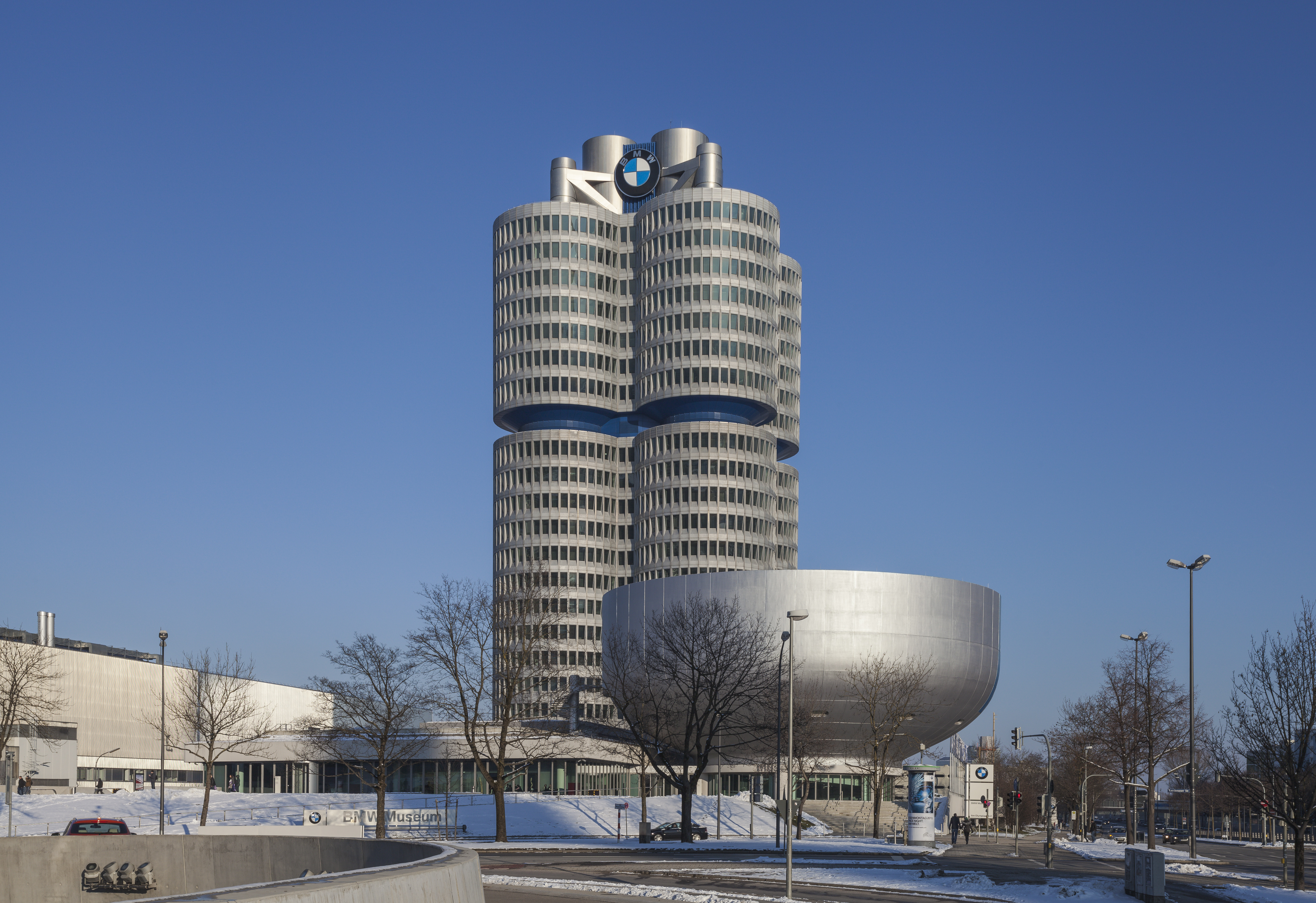
The BMW Headquarters

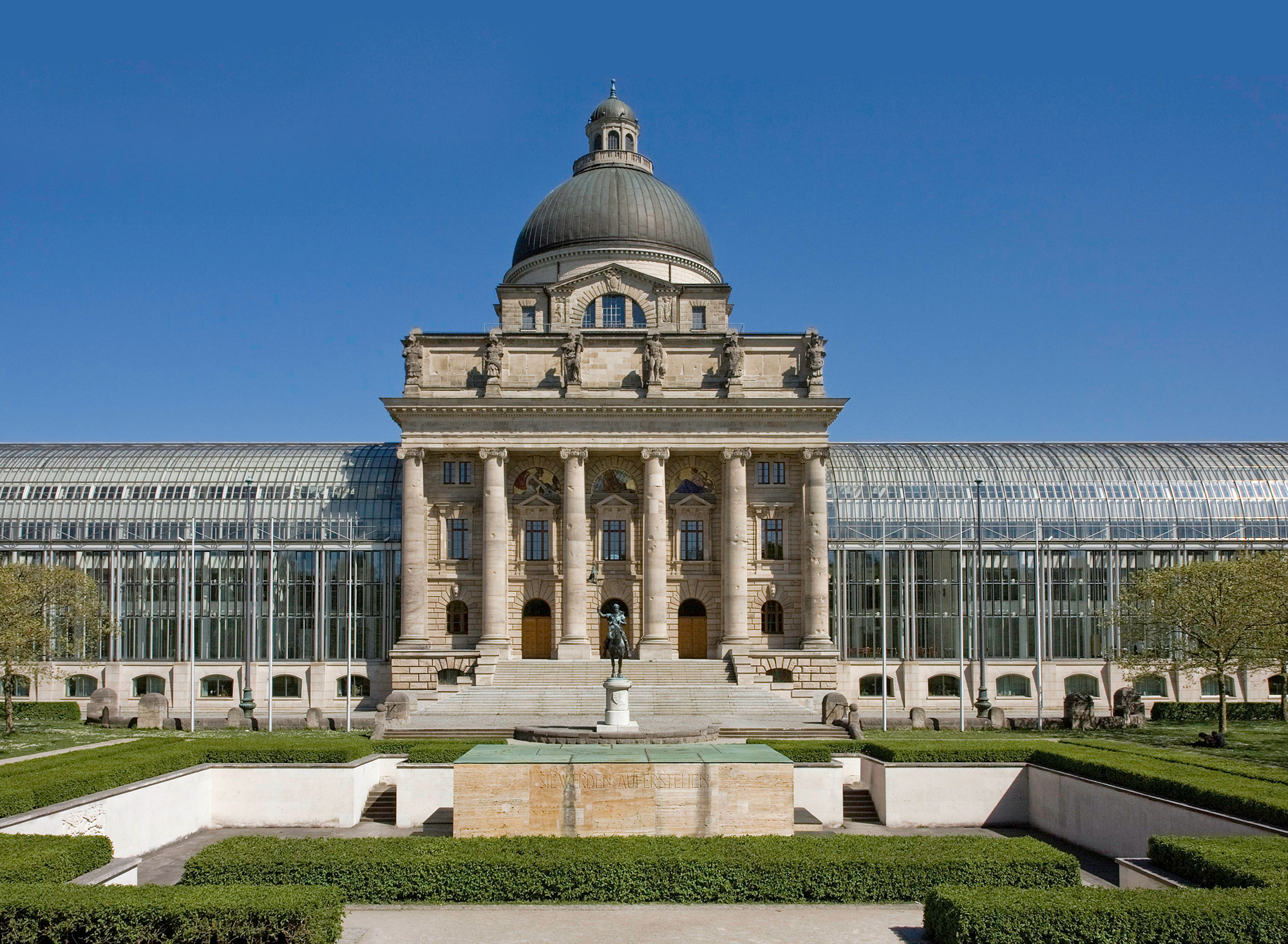
Bayerische Staatskanzlei

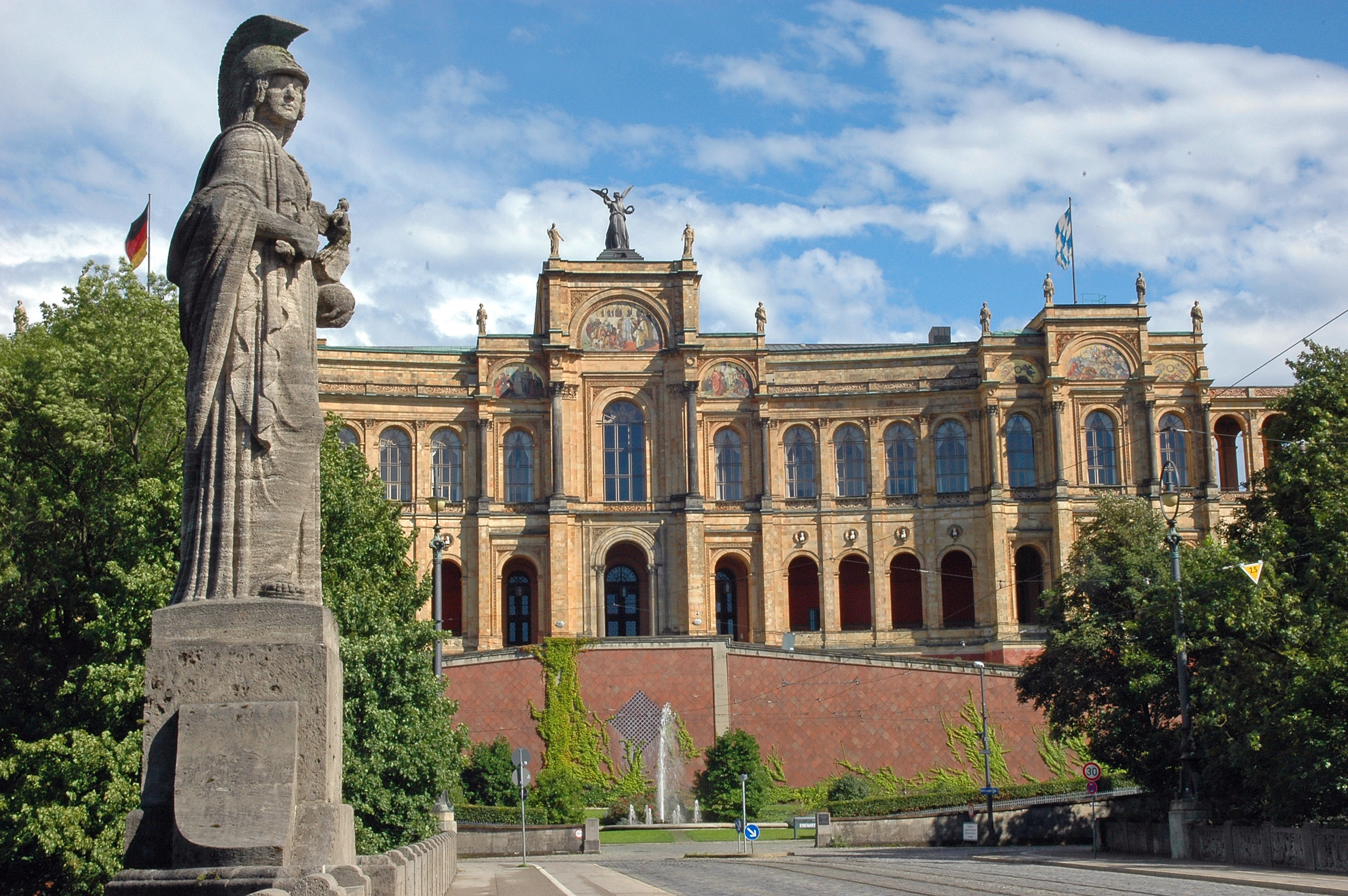
The Maximilianeum

- Bavarian State Library
- Bayerische Staatskanzlei
- BMW Headquarters
- Circus Krone Building
- Hypo-Haus
- Justizpalast
- Maximilianeum
- New Town Hall
  - Rathaus-Glockenspiel
- Old Technical Town Hall
- Old Town Hall
- SiemensForum München
- SV-Hochhaus

==== Streets in Munich ====
Streets in Munich

- Alte Allee
- Brienner Straße
- Hohenzollernstraße
- Leopoldstraße
- Ludwigstraße
- Maximilianstraße
- Prinzregentenstraße
- Sendlinger Straße
- Sonnenstraße
- Tal

==== Theatres in Munich ====
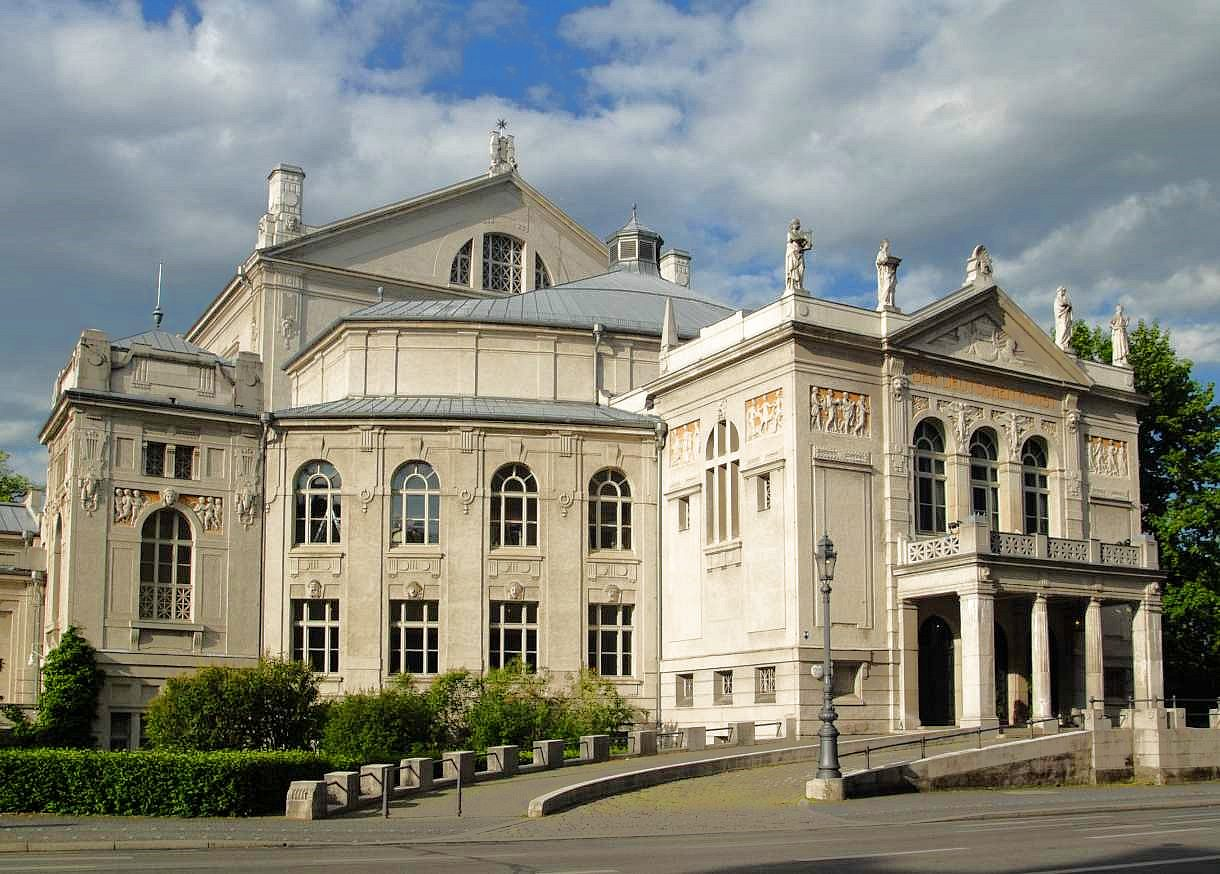
Prinzregententheater

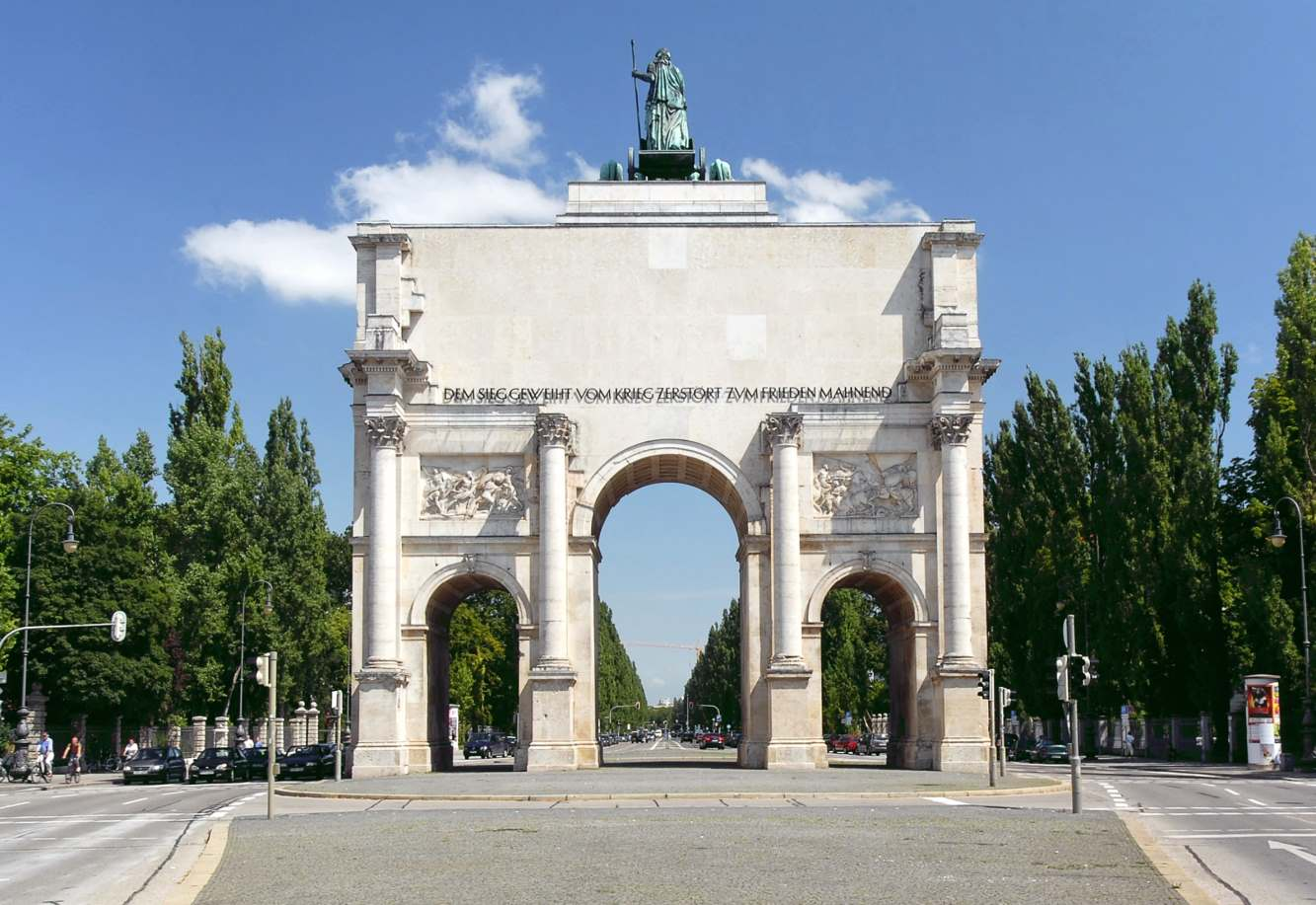
The Siegestor

Theatres in Munich

- Cuvilliés Theatre
- Deutsches Theater
- Münchner Marionettentheater
- National Theatre Munich
- Prinzregententheater
- Residenz Theatre
- Staatstheater am Gärtnerplatz

==== Triumphal arches in Munich ====
- Siegestor

=== Demographics of Munich ===
Demographics of Munich

- Population growth of Munich

== Government and politics of Munich ==
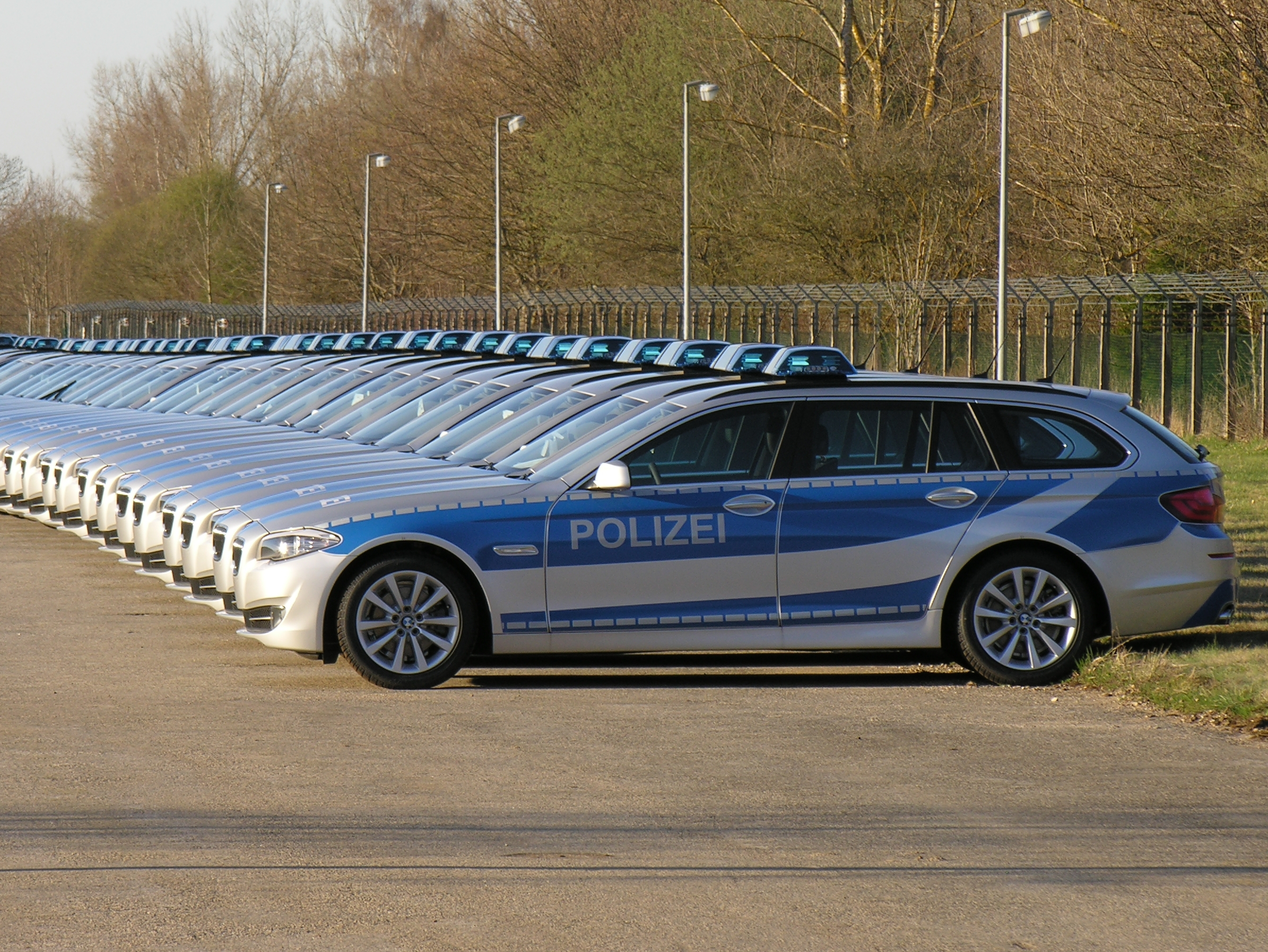
BMW 535d (F11) station wagons in the new blue livery of the Bavarian State Police

Administration of Munich

- Landtag of Bavaria
- Mayor of Munich

=== Law and order in Munich ===
- Bavarian State Police
  - Bavarian Border Police
  - Polizeipräsidium München

== History of Munich ==
History of Munich

=== History of Munich, by period or event ===
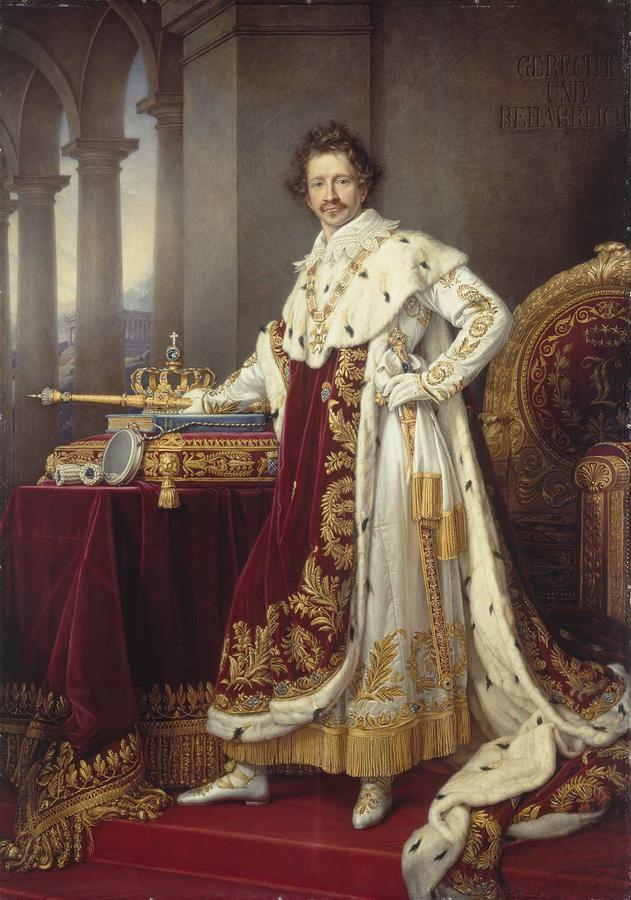
Ludwig I of Bavaria, King of Bavaria, an important sponsor for the arts in Munich

Timeline of Munich

- Founding of Munich (1158)
- Munich during the Middle Ages
  - Duchy of Bavaria (from the 6th through the 8th century)
    - Capital of the reunited duchy of Bavaria – Munich becomes capital of the whole of Bavaria (1506)
  - Kingdom of Bavaria (1805–1918)
    - Capital of the Kingdom of Bavaria – Munich becomes the capital of the new Kingdom of Bavaria (1806)
  - Munich during World War I
  - Munich during the Weimar Republic, the Nazi Regime, and the World War II
    - Beer Hall Putsch (8–9 November 1923)
    - Munich Agreement (1938)
      - Lesson of Munich
    - Bombing of Munich in World War II (in the later stages of World War II)
  - Munich today (1945–present)

=== History of Munich, by subject ===
- History of the Jews in Munich

== Culture of Munich ==
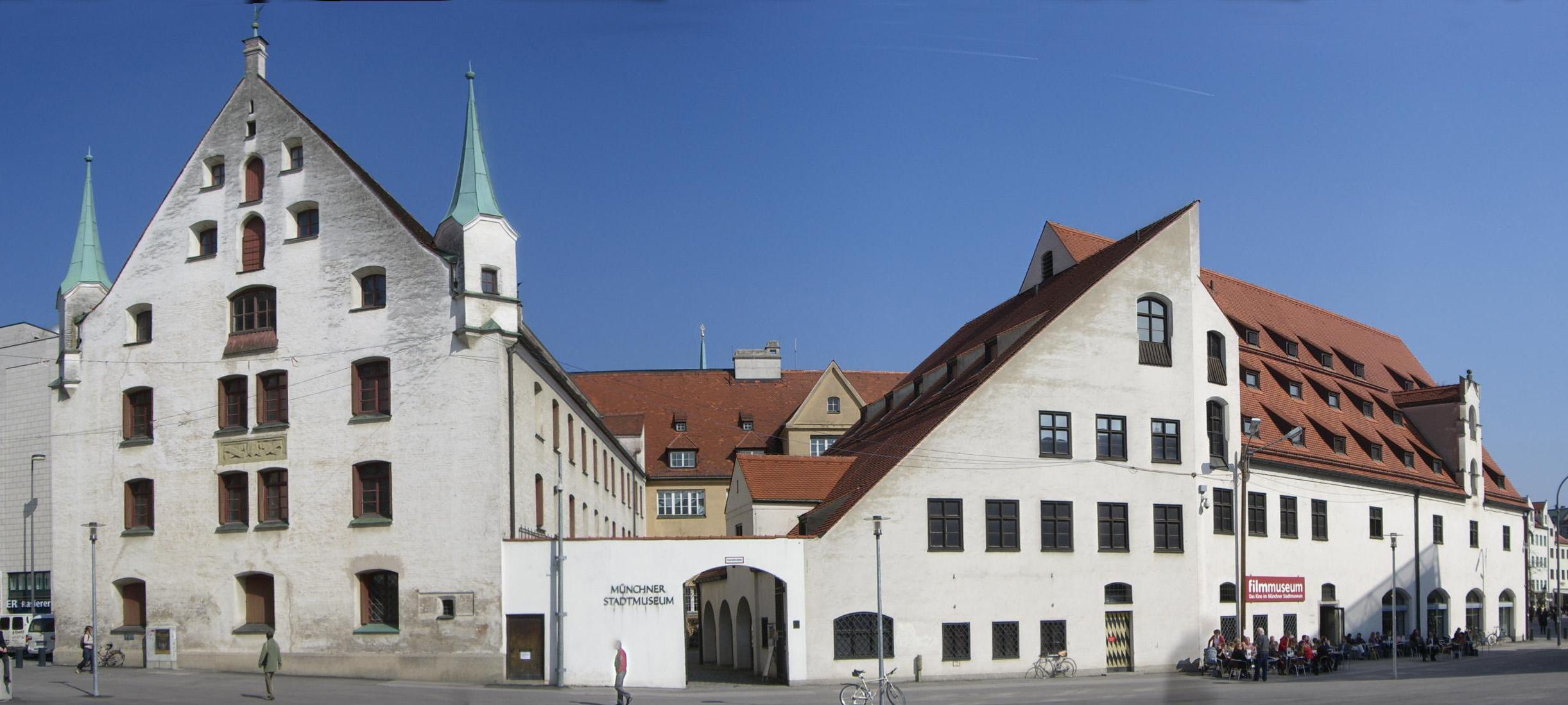
The Munich Stadtmuseum

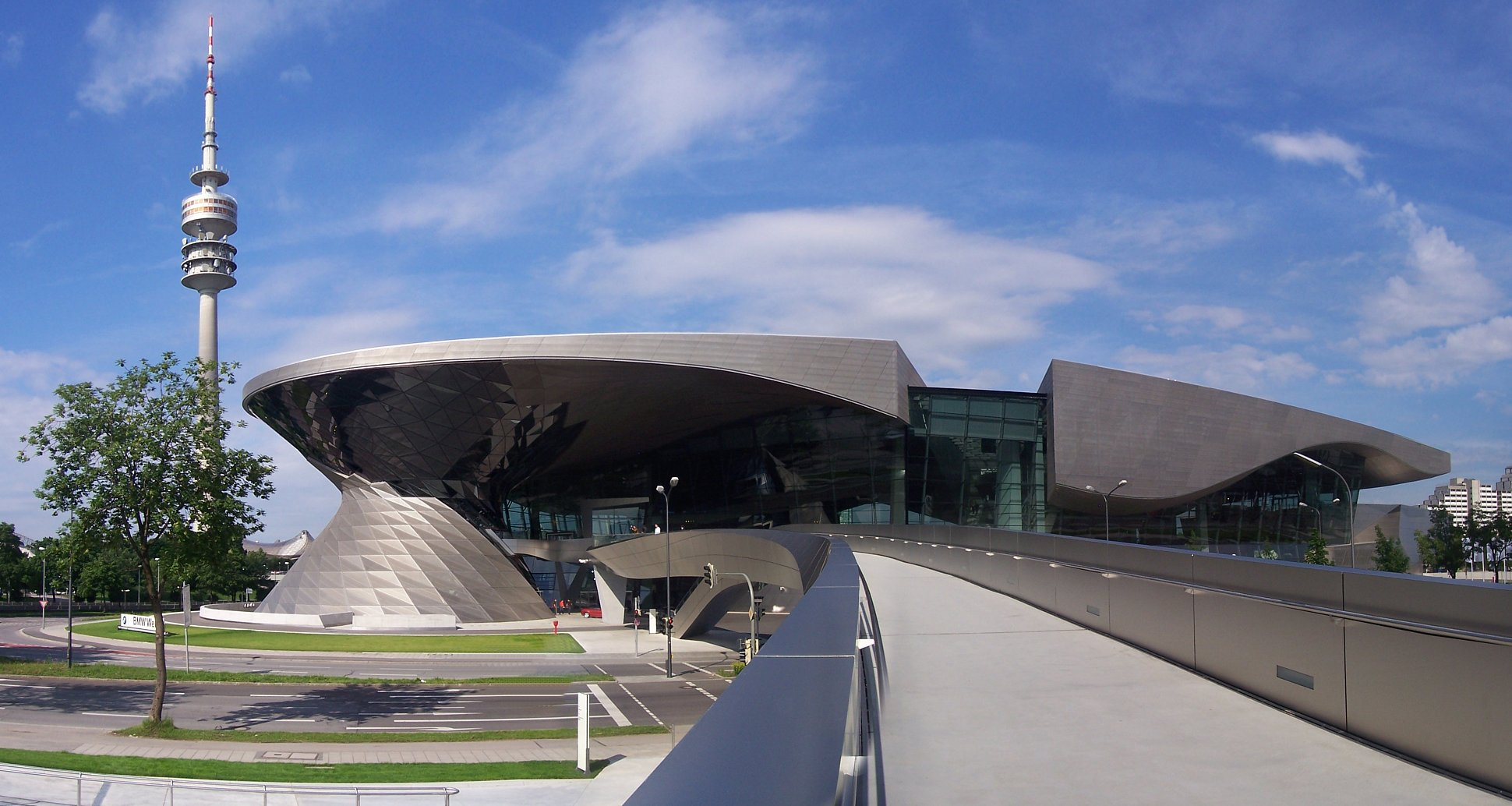
BMW Welt, a multi-use exhibition center situated next to the BMW Headquarters

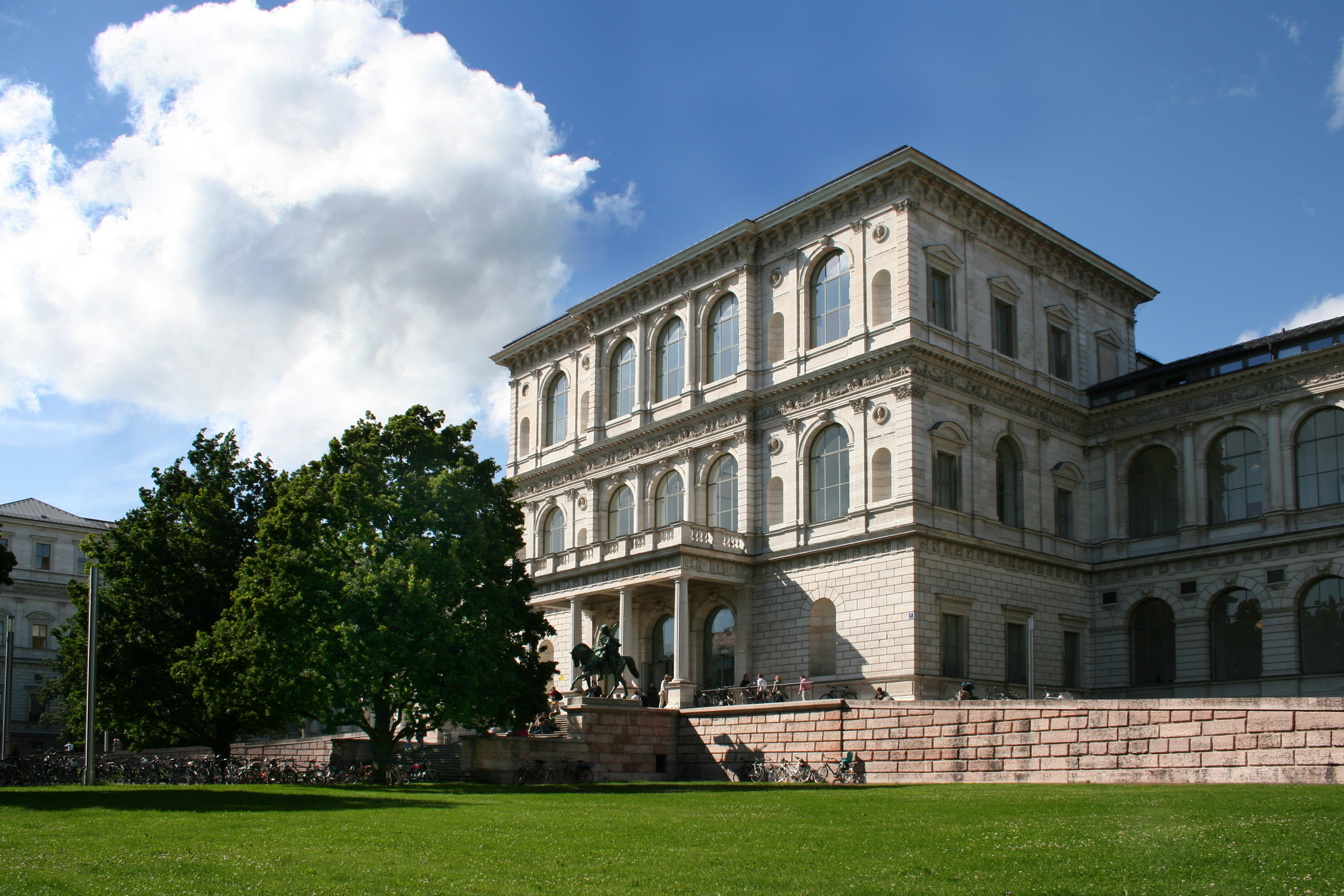
Façade of the Academy of Fine Arts in Neo-Renaissance style

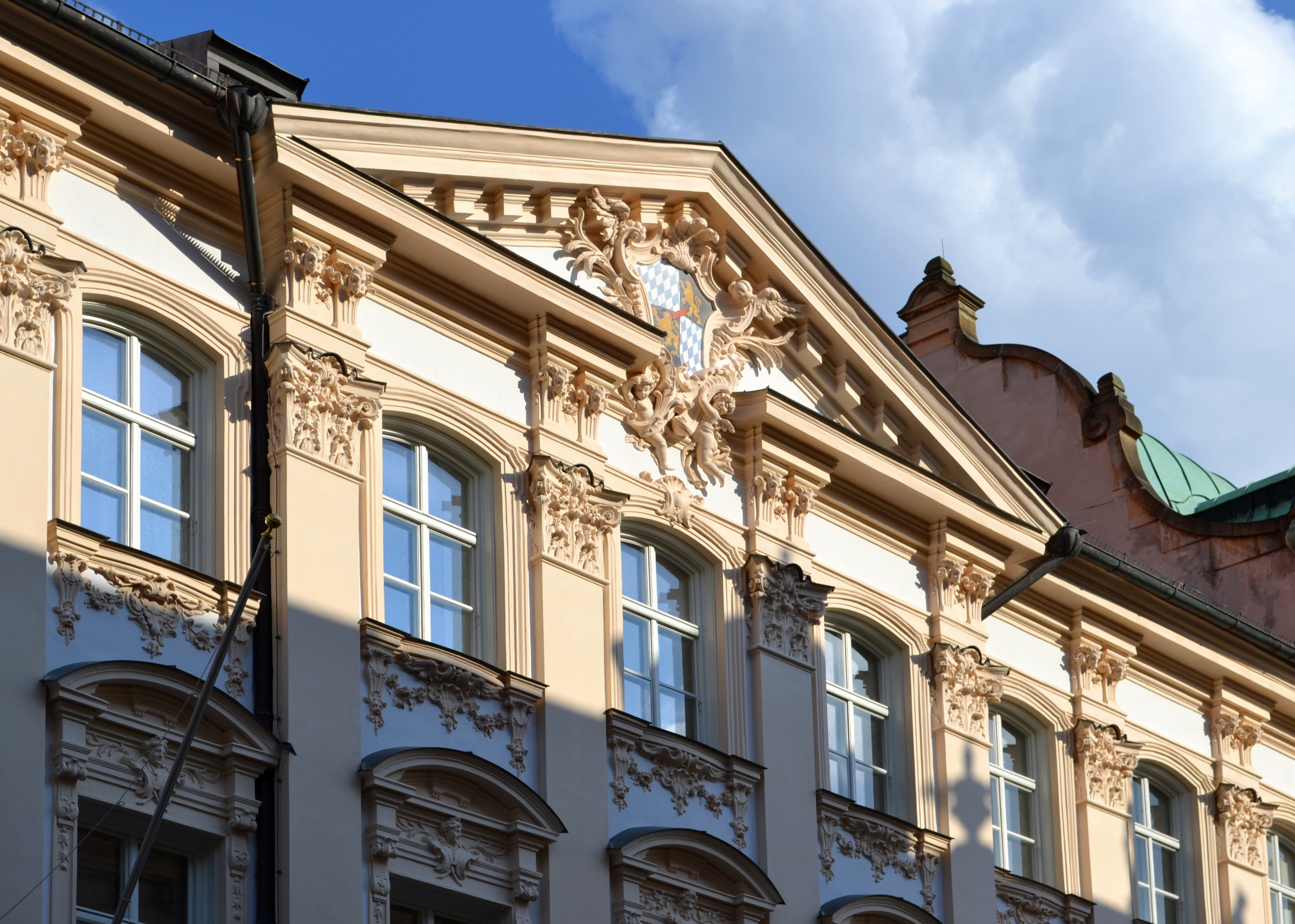
The Rococo façade of the Holnstein Palace

=== Arts in Munich ===
==== Architecture of Munich ====
Architecture of Munich

- Art Nouveau architecture in Munich
  - Hofatelier Elvira
- Baroque architecture in Munich
  - Bürgersaalkirche
  - Nymphenburg Palace
- Gothic Revival architecture in Munich
  - Munich Stadtmuseum
  - New Town Hall
  - St Paul's Church
- Modern architecture in Munich
  - BMW Welt
  - Highlight Towers
  - Hochhaus Uptown München
  - SV-Hochhaus
- Neoclassical architecture in Munich
  - Glyptothek
  - Prinz-Carl-Palais
  - Staatliche Antikensammlungen
- Neo-Renaissance architecture in Munich
  - Academy of Fine Arts
- Renaissance architecture in Munich
  - Munich Residenz
  - Old Academy
- Rococo architecture in Munich
  - Cuvilliés Theatre
  - Holnstein Palace

==== Cinema of Munich ====
- Bavaria Film
- Constantin Film
- Munich Film Museum
- Museum Lichtspiele

==== Music of Munich ====
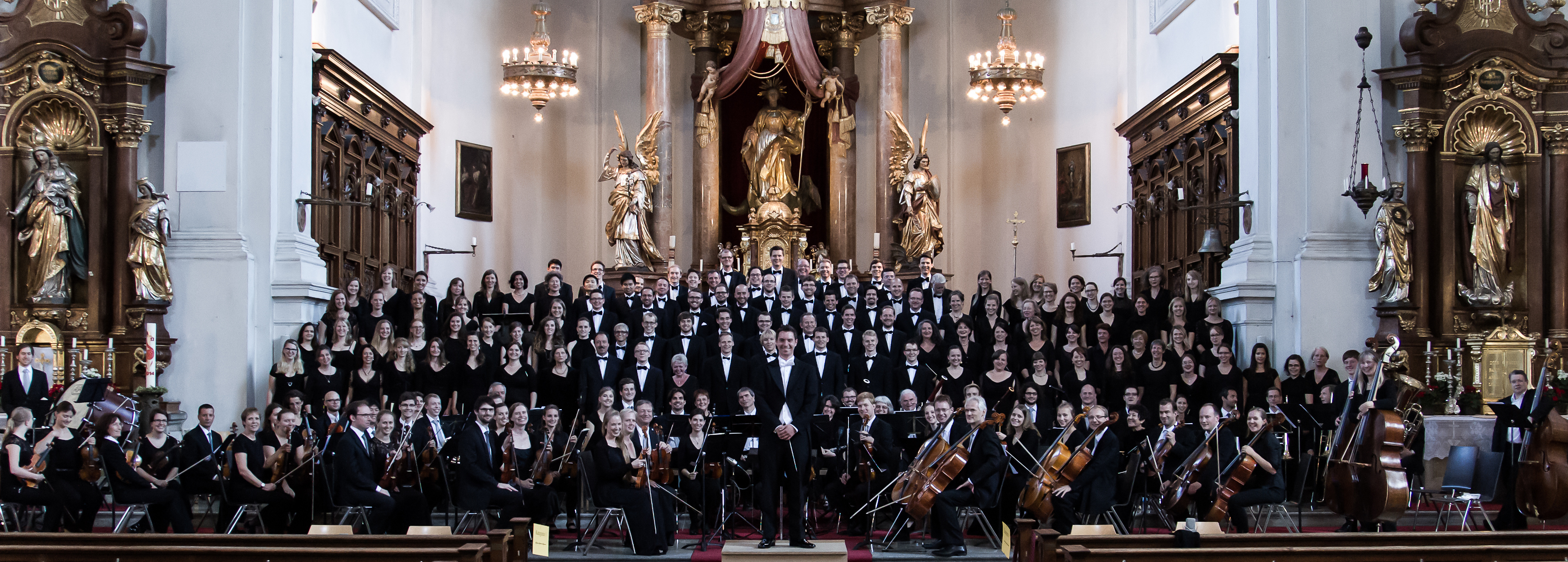
The MünchenKlang ensemble comprising a choir and an orchestra

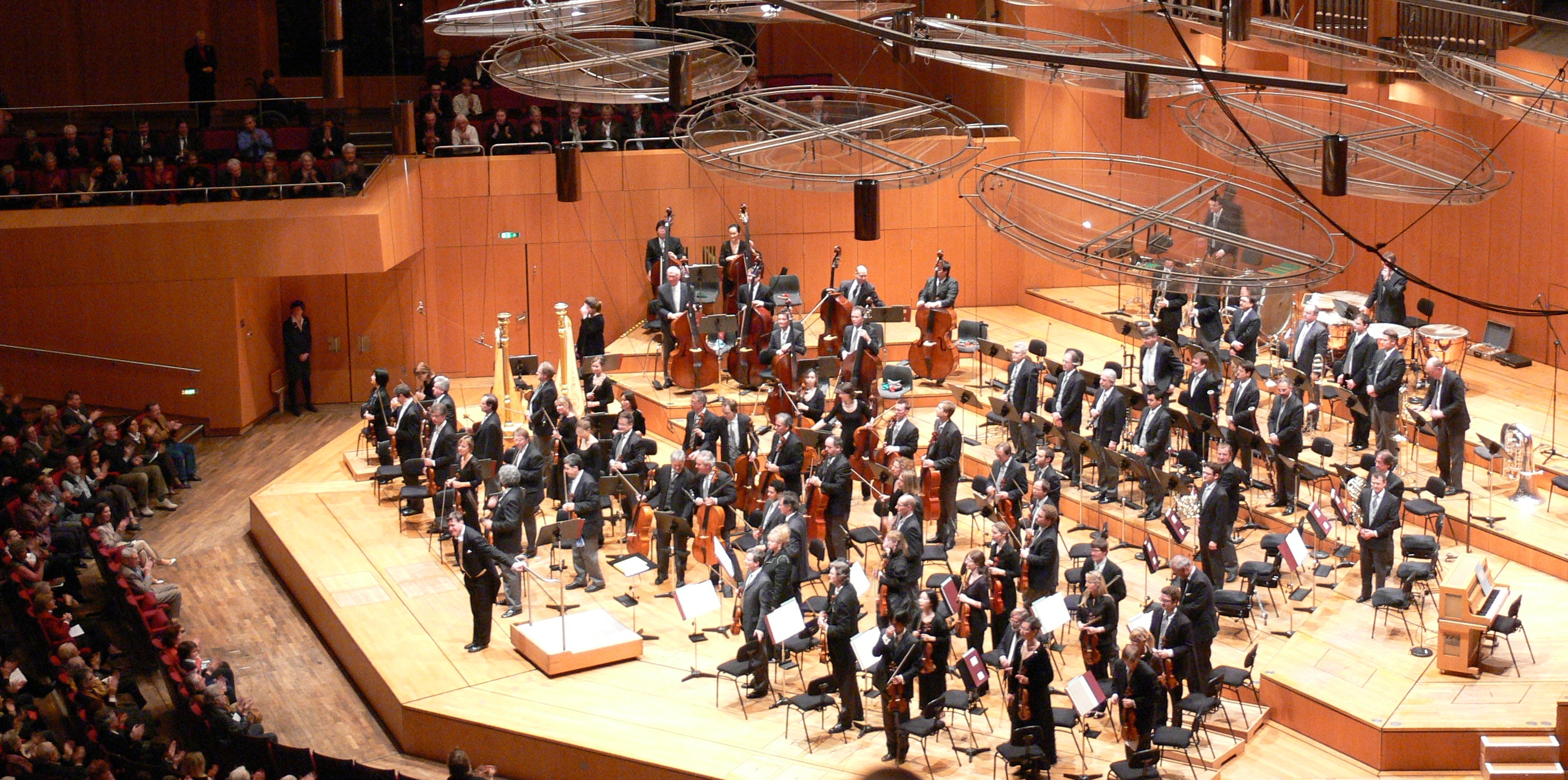
The Munich Philharmonic

Music of Munich

- Bavarian Radio Symphony Orchestra
- Bavarian State Opera
- Bavarian State Orchestra
- Bayerisches Staatsballett
- Münchener Bach-Chor
- MünchenKlang
- Munich Chamber Orchestra
- Munich Philharmonic
- Munich Radio Orchestra
- Munich Symphony Orchestra
- Philharmonischer Chor München

==== Theatre of Munich ====
- Munich Kammerspiele

==== Visual arts of Munich ====
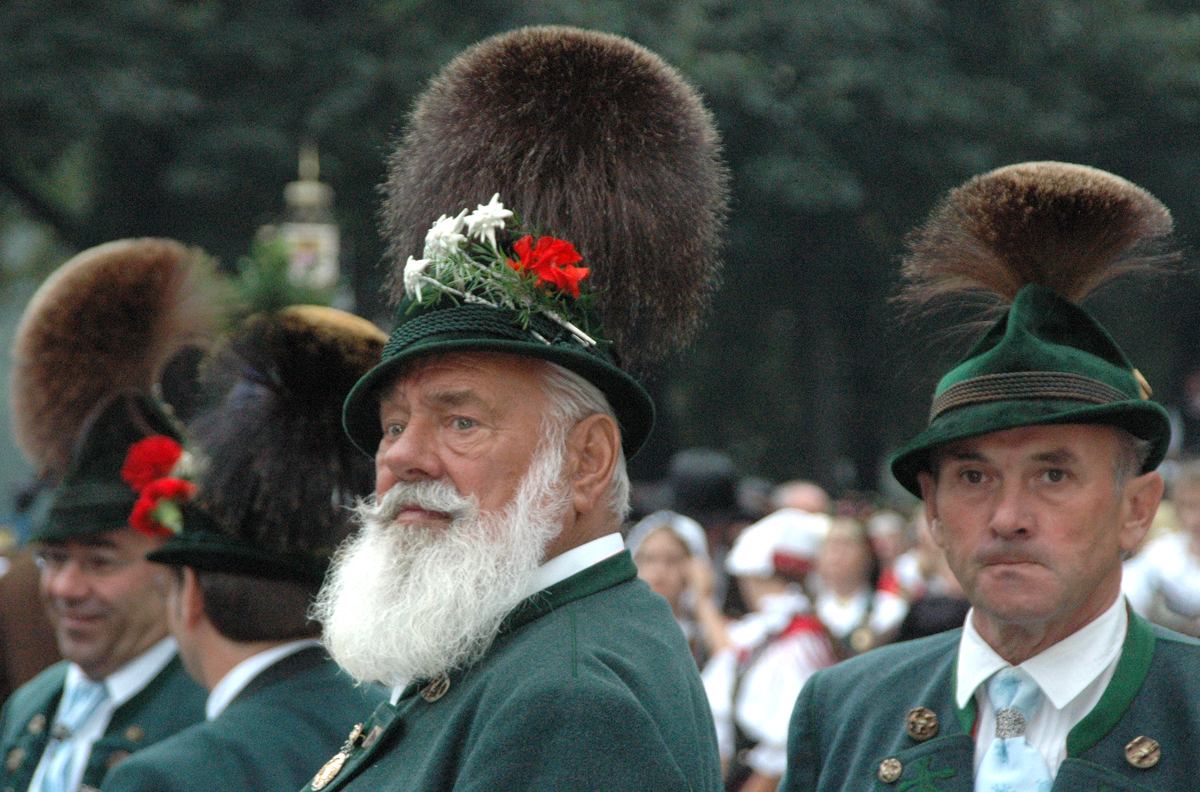
Gamsbart, a tuft of hair traditionally worn on Trachten hats as a decoration

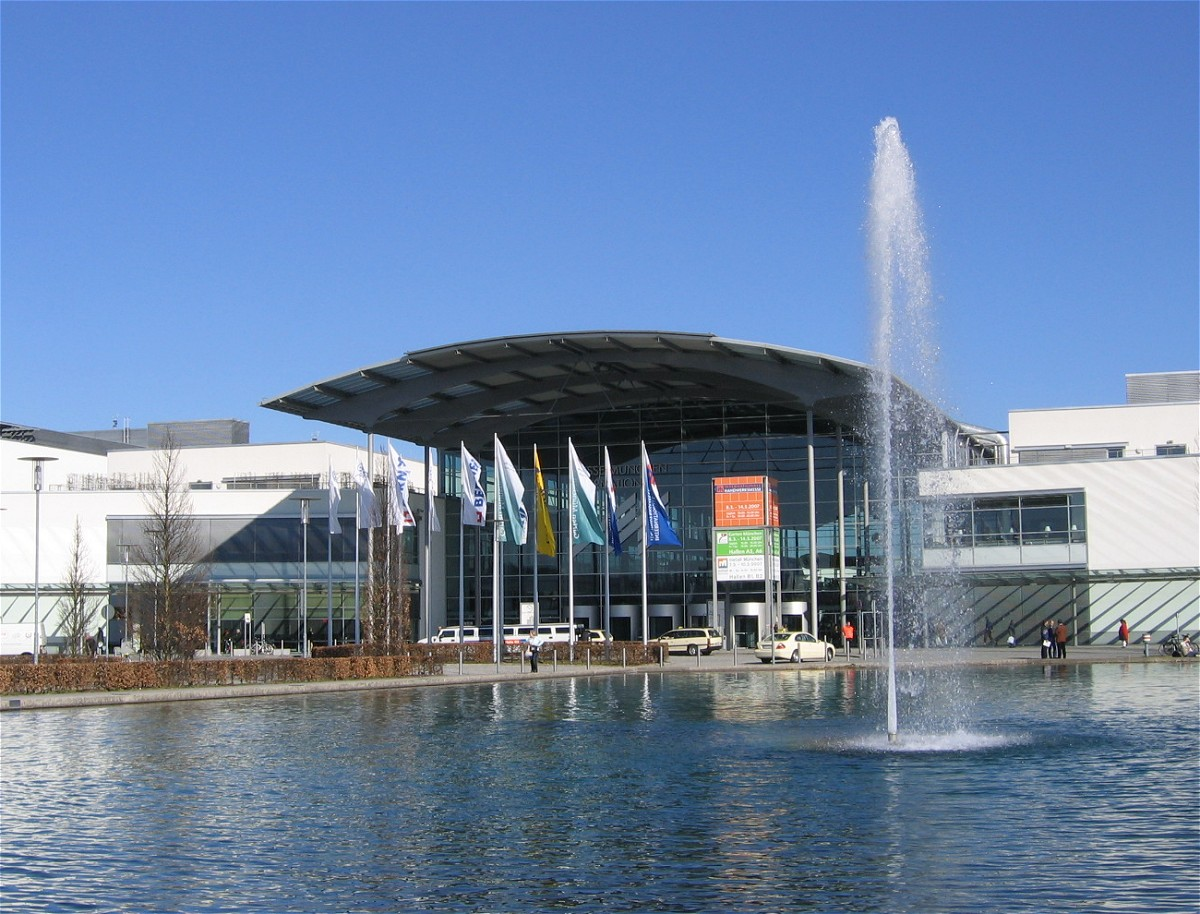
The Neue Messe München exhibition center

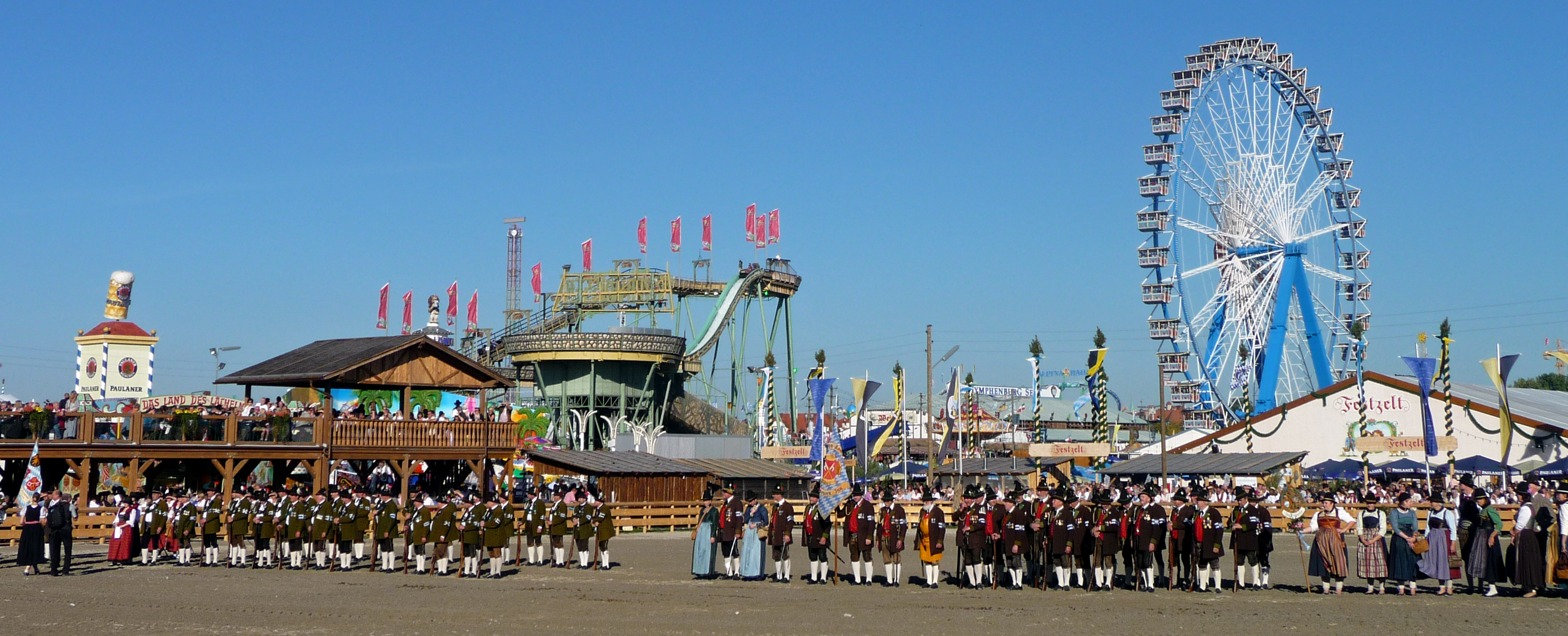
Celebrating 200 years of Oktoberfest in 2010

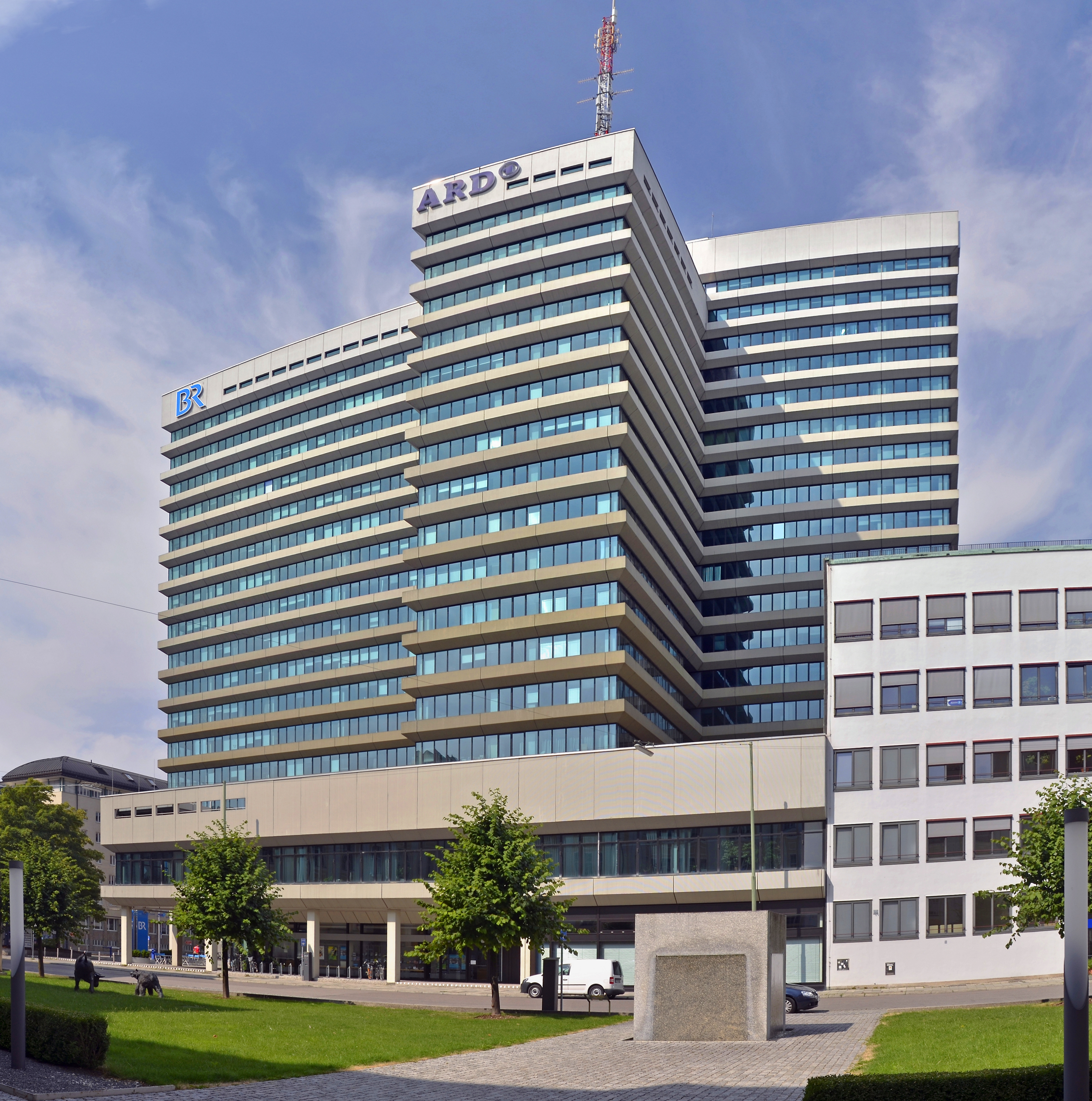
The Bayerischer Rundfunk's headquarters in Munich

- Munich School
- Munich Secession

Bavarian traditional clothing

- Tracht
  - Bavarian hat
    - Gamsbart
  - Dirndl
  - Haferlschuh
  - Lederhosen

Cuisine of Munich

- Culinary specialities

Events in Munich

- Christkindlmarkt at Marienplatz
- Electronica
- International Garden Expo 83
- Internationale Fachmesse für Sportartikel und Sportmode
- Kunstmesse München
- Mineralientage München
- Munich Biennale
- Munich Opera Festival
- Munich Science Days
- Oktoberfest
- Streetlife Festival

Languages of Munich

- Bavarian language

Media in Munich

- Newspapers in Munich
  - Abendzeitung
  - Münchner Merkur
  - Süddeutsche Zeitung
  - Tz (newspaper)
- Radio and television in Munich
  - Bayerischer Rundfunk

People from Munich

- List of honorary citizens of Munich

=== Religion in Munich ===
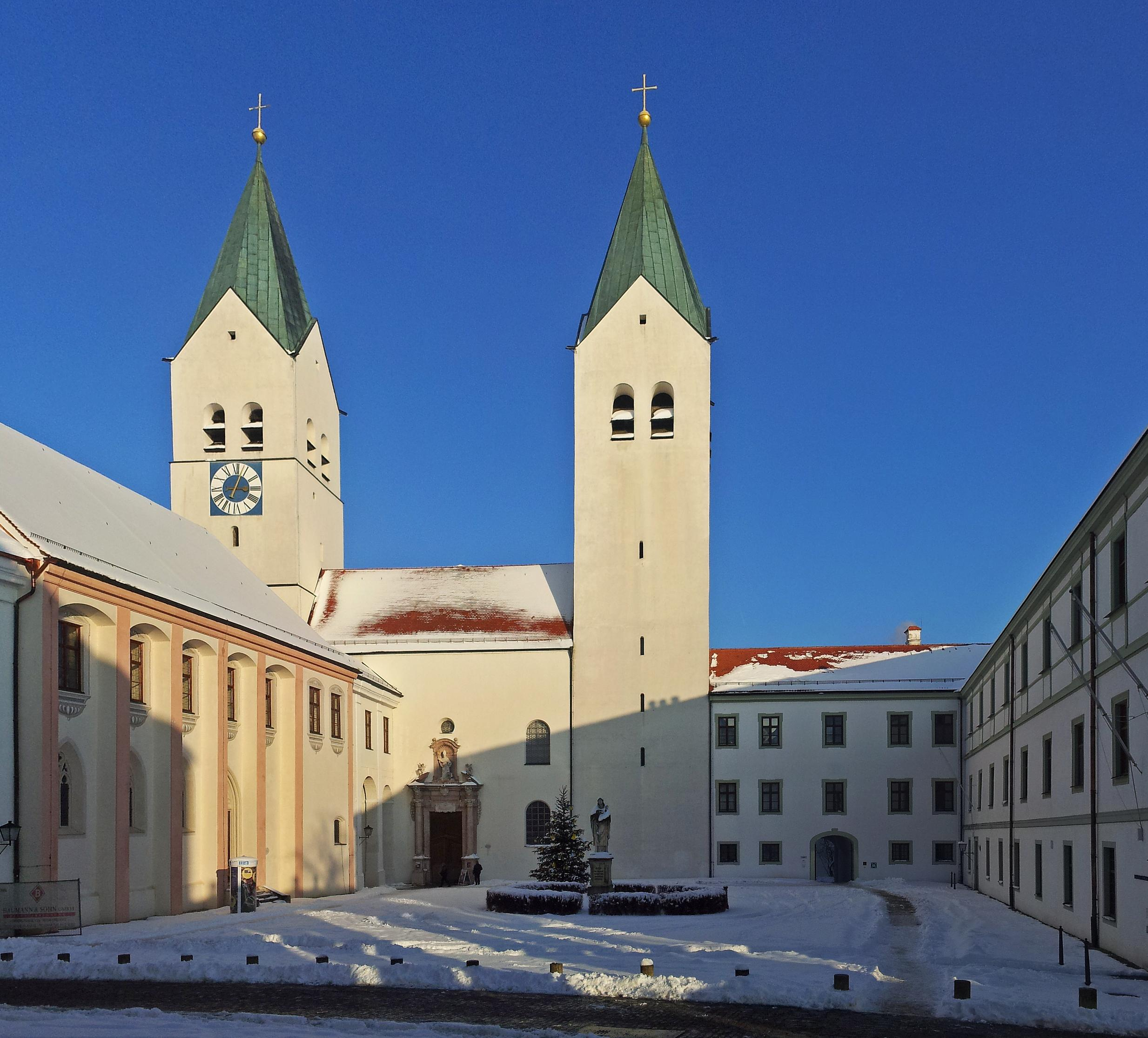
The Freising Cathedral

Religion in Munich

- Catholicism in Munich
  - Roman Catholic Archdiocese of Munich
    - Munich Frauenkirche
    - Freising Cathedral
- Protestantism in Munich
  - Protestantism in Munich
    - St Luke's Church
- Islam in Munich
  - Mosque in Sendling
- Judaism in Munich
  - History of the Jews in Munich
    - Ohel Jakob Synagogue

=== Sports in Munich ===
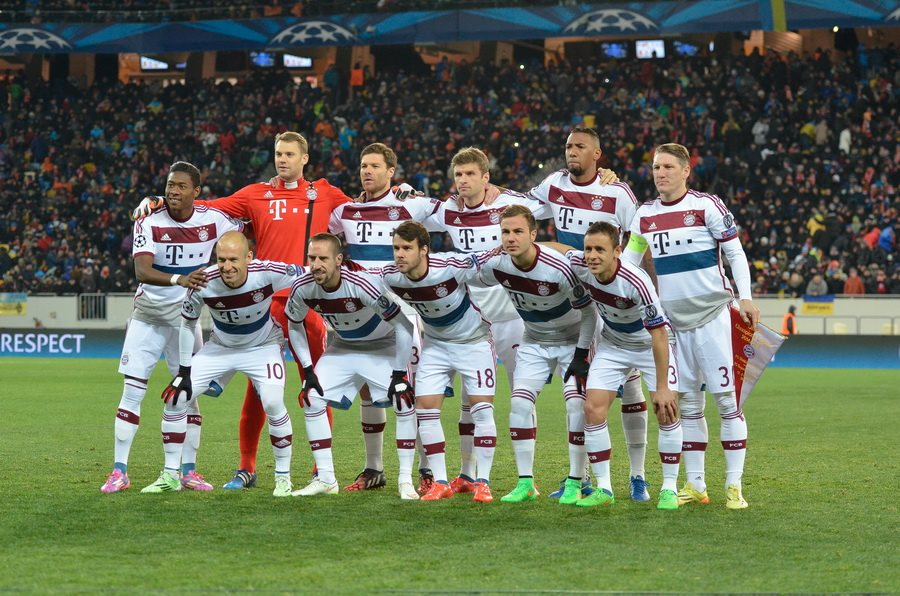
The FC Bayern Munich team in 2015

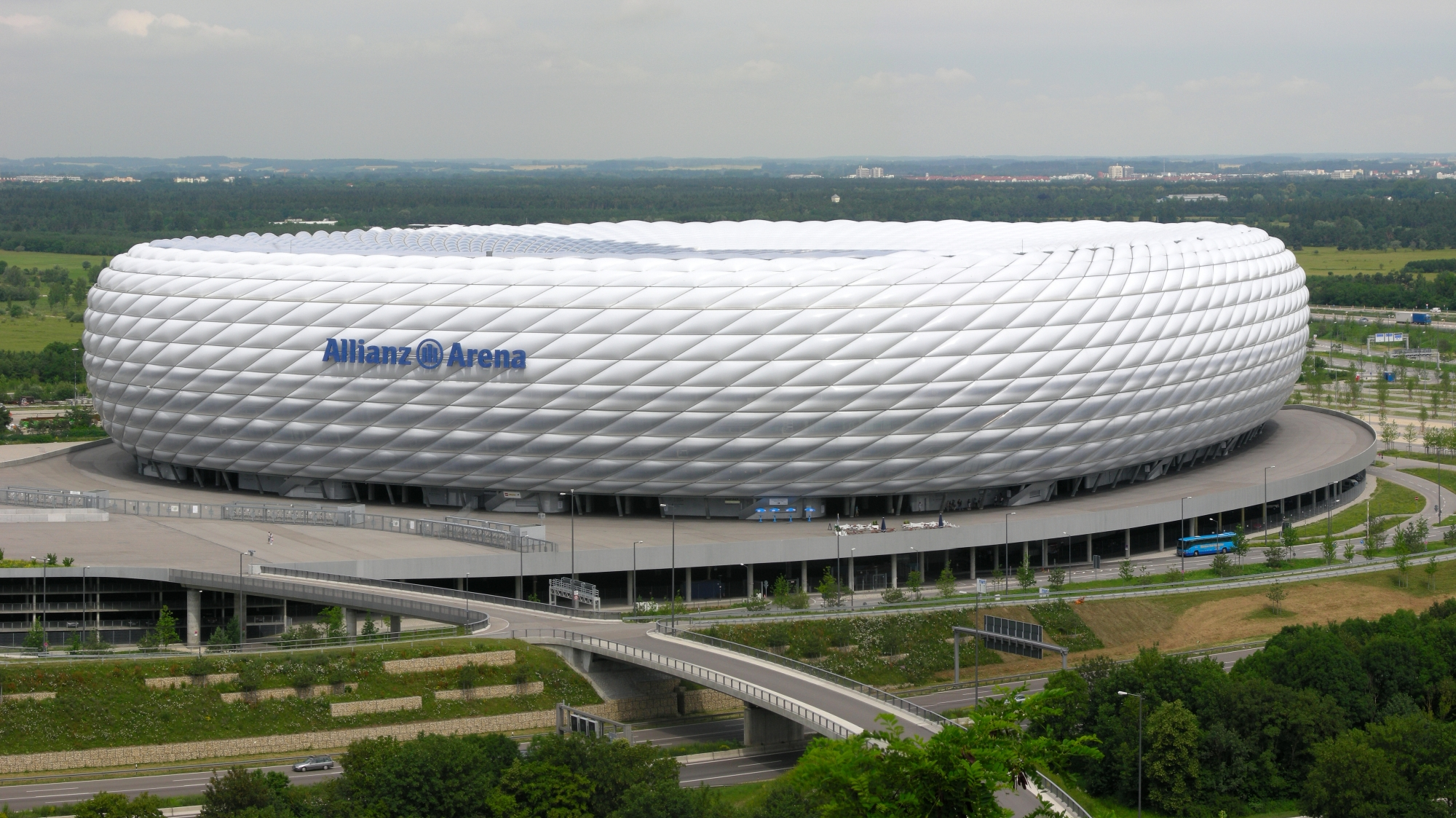
The Allianz Arena

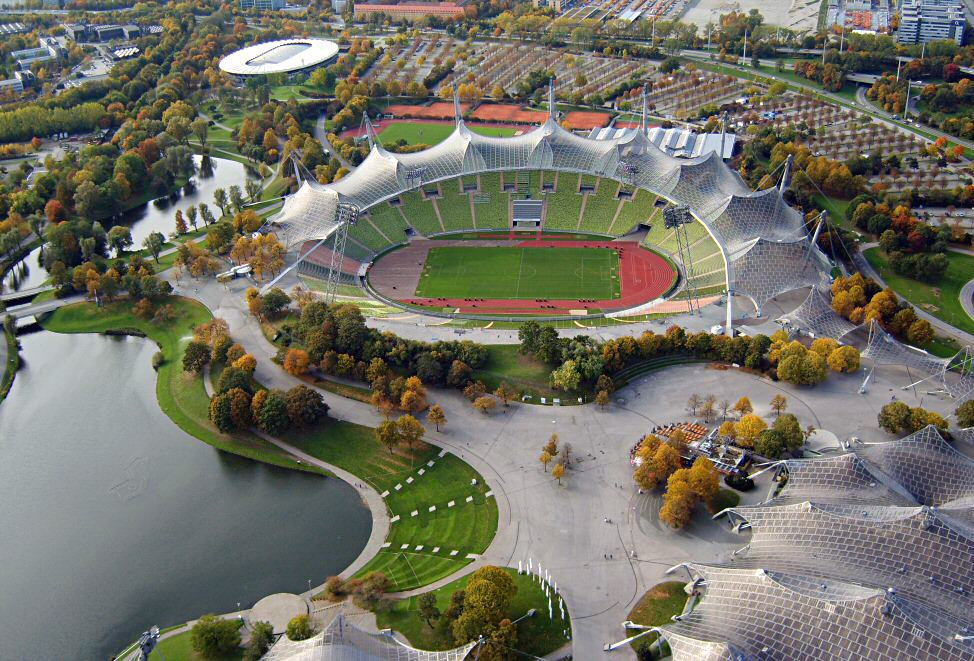
The Olympiastadion

Sport in Munich

- Basketball in Munich
  - FC Bayern Munich (basketball)
- Football in Munich
  - FC Bayern Munich
    - List of FC Bayern Munich players
  - TSV 1860 Munich
  - Munich derby
- Rugby football in Munich
  - München RFC
- Ice hockey in Munich
  - EHC Red Bull München
- Olympics in Munich
  - 1972 Summer Olympics
- Running in Munich
  - Munich Marathon
- Sports venues in Munich
  - Allianz Arena
  - Grünwalder Stadion
  - Olympia Eishalle
  - Olympia Schwimmhalle
  - Olympiastadion
  - Radstadion
  - Rudi-Sedlmayer-Halle

== Economy and infrastructure of Munich ==
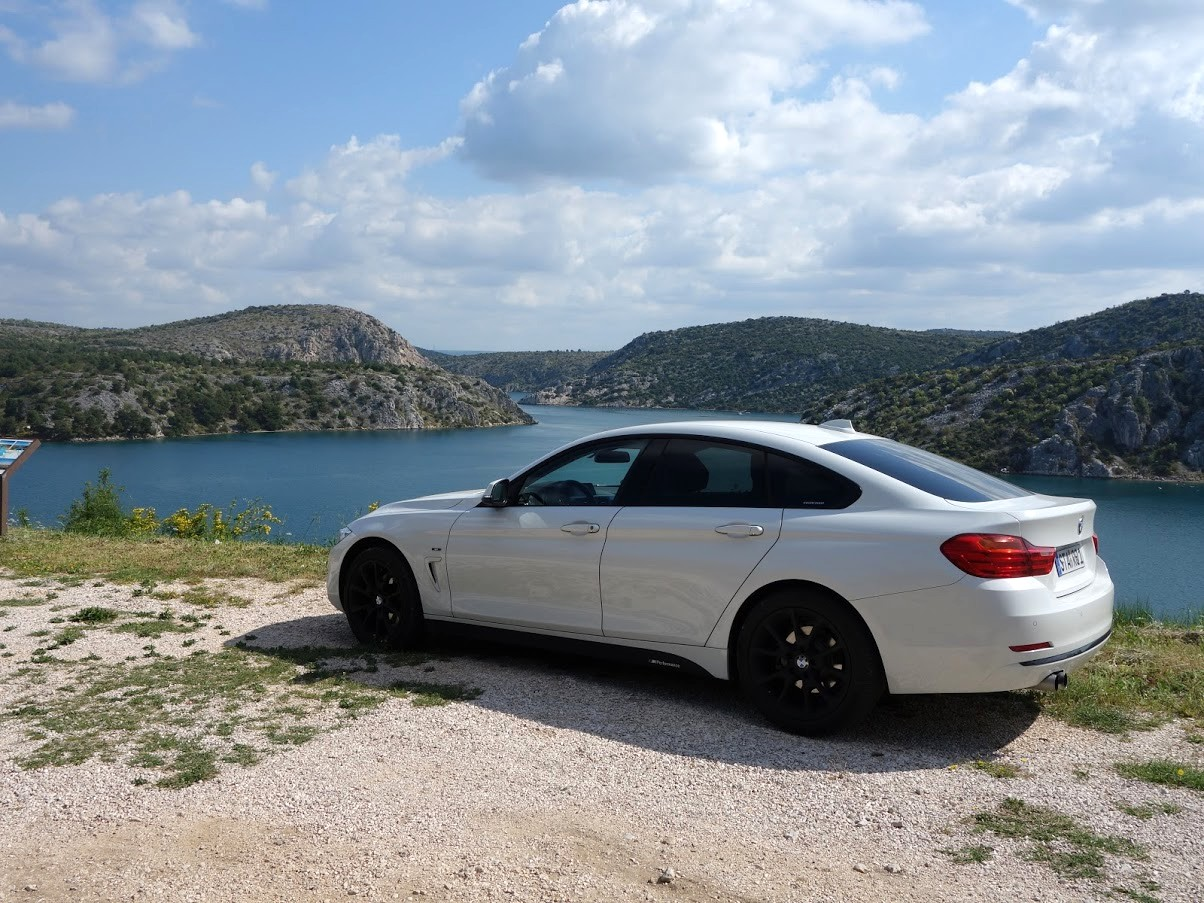
BMW 420d Gran Coupé, a four-door coupé in the premium midsize class produced by the Bavarian manufacturer BMW

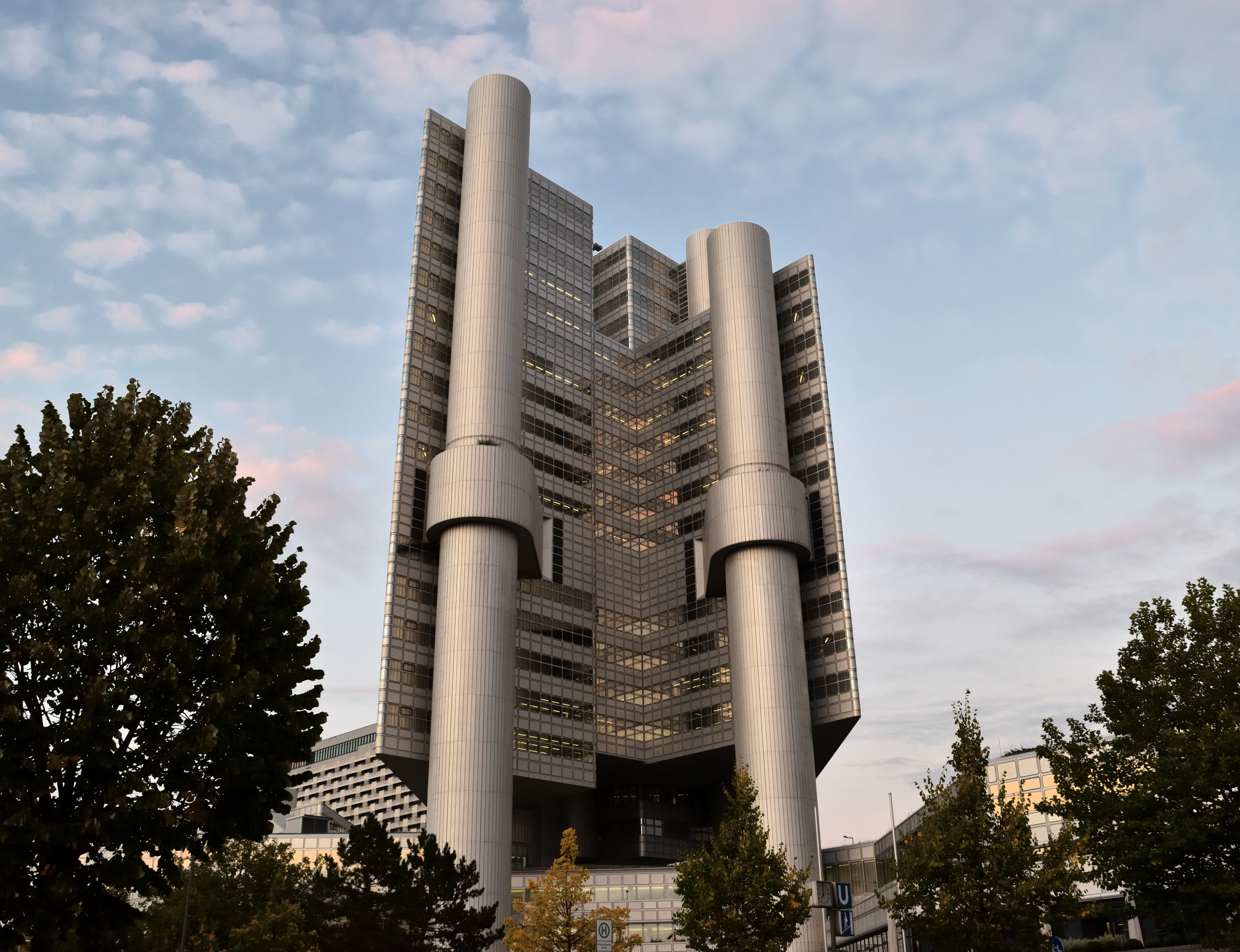
The Hypo-Haus, a central administrative building of the HypoVereinsbank

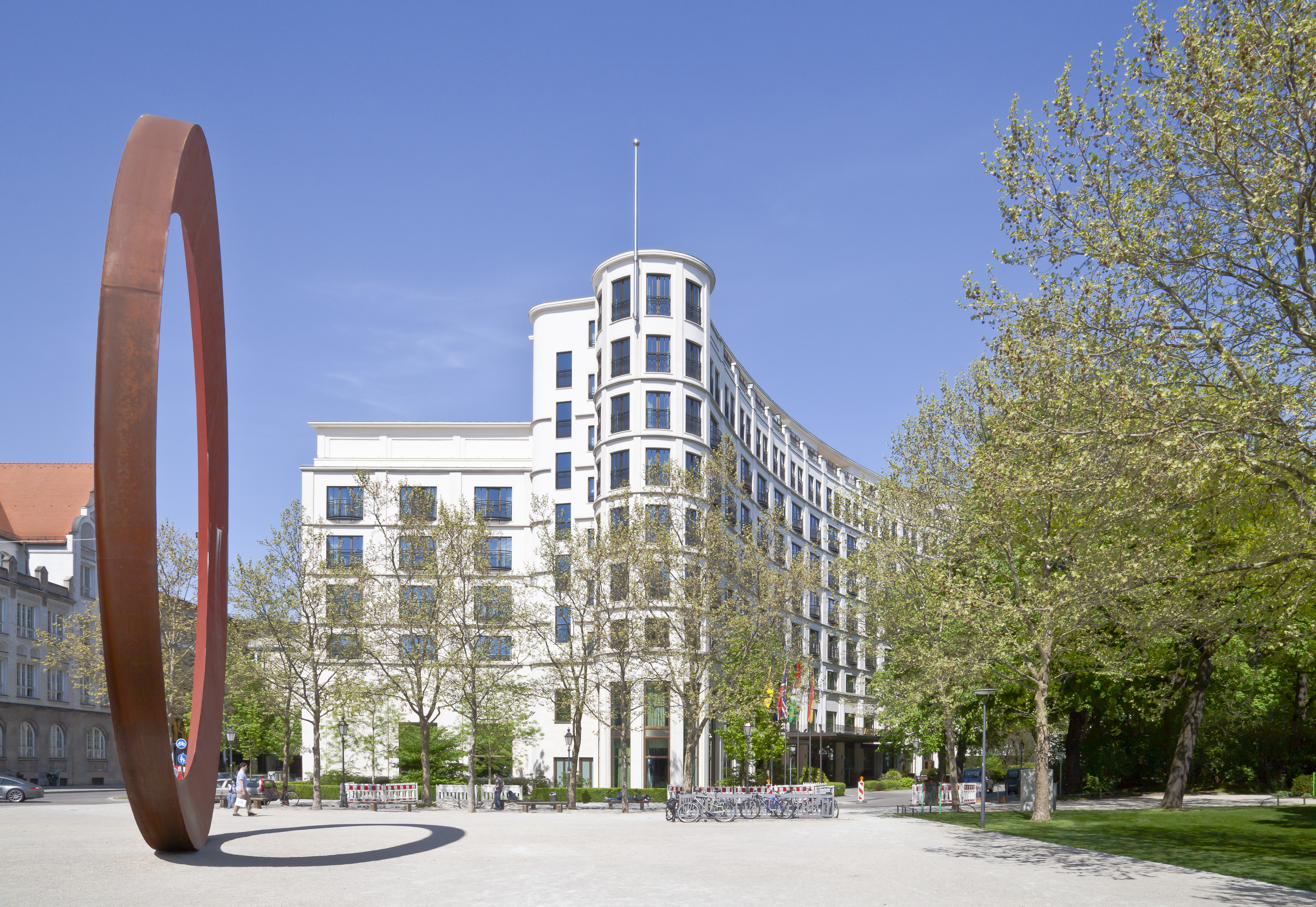
The Charles Hotel

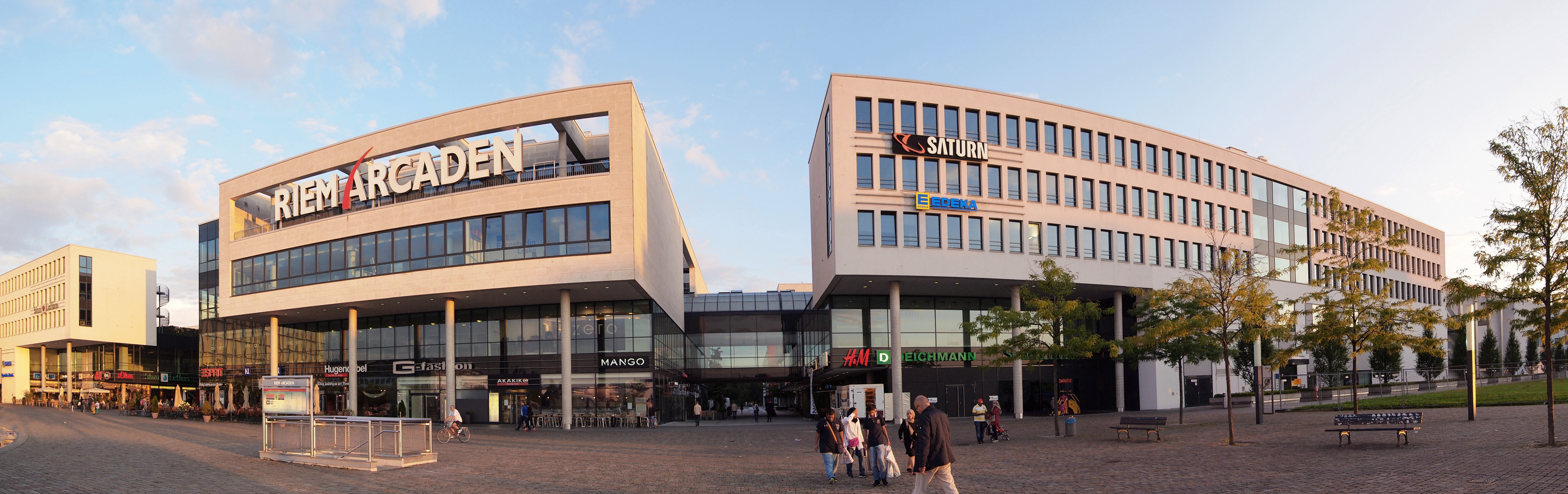
The Riem Arcaden

Economy of Munich

- Automotive industry in Munich
  - BMW
    - BMW Headquarters
    - BMW vehicles
  - MAN SE
- Electronics industry in Munich
  - Rohde & Schwarz
  - Siemens
- Financial services in Munich
  - Munich's financial community
    - Allianz
    - Börse München
    - HypoVereinsbank
- Hotels in Munich
  - Hotel Bayerischer Hof
  - Hotel Königshof
  - Hotel Vier Jahreszeiten
  - Mandarin Oriental
  - Sheraton Munich Arabellapark Hotel
  - The Charles Hotel
- Restaurants and cafés in Munich
  - Café-Bistro Dallmayr
  - Hirschgarten
  - Hofbräuhaus am Platzl
  - Wienerwald
- Shopping malls and markets in Munich
  - Hofstatt
  - Karstadt München Bahnhofplatz
  - Olympia-Einkaufszentrum
  - Pasing Arcaden
  - Riem Arcaden
  - Weekly Markets in Munich
    - Wholesale Market Munich

=== Transportation in Munich ===
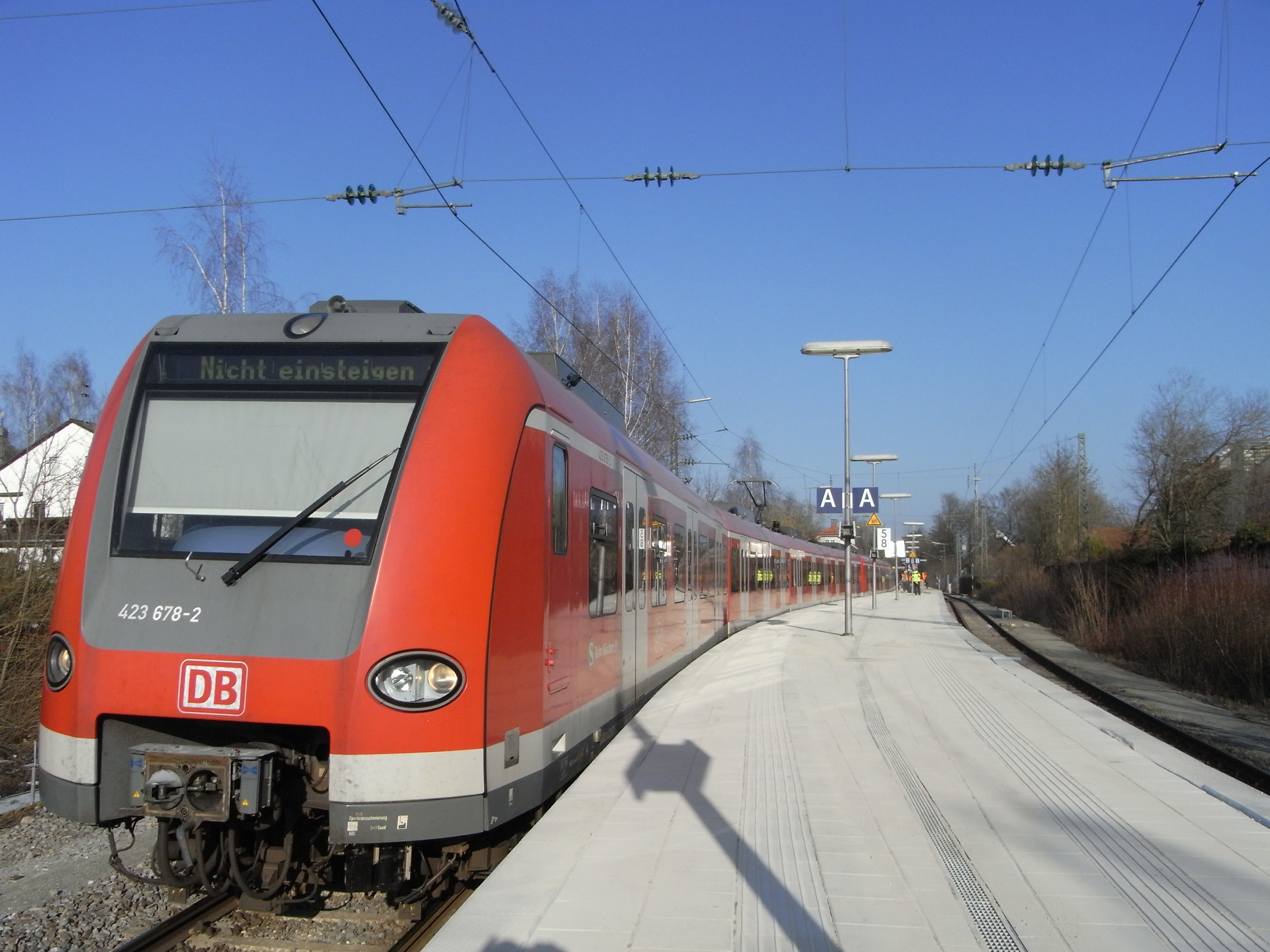
Class 423 train at Ebersberg S-Bahn station

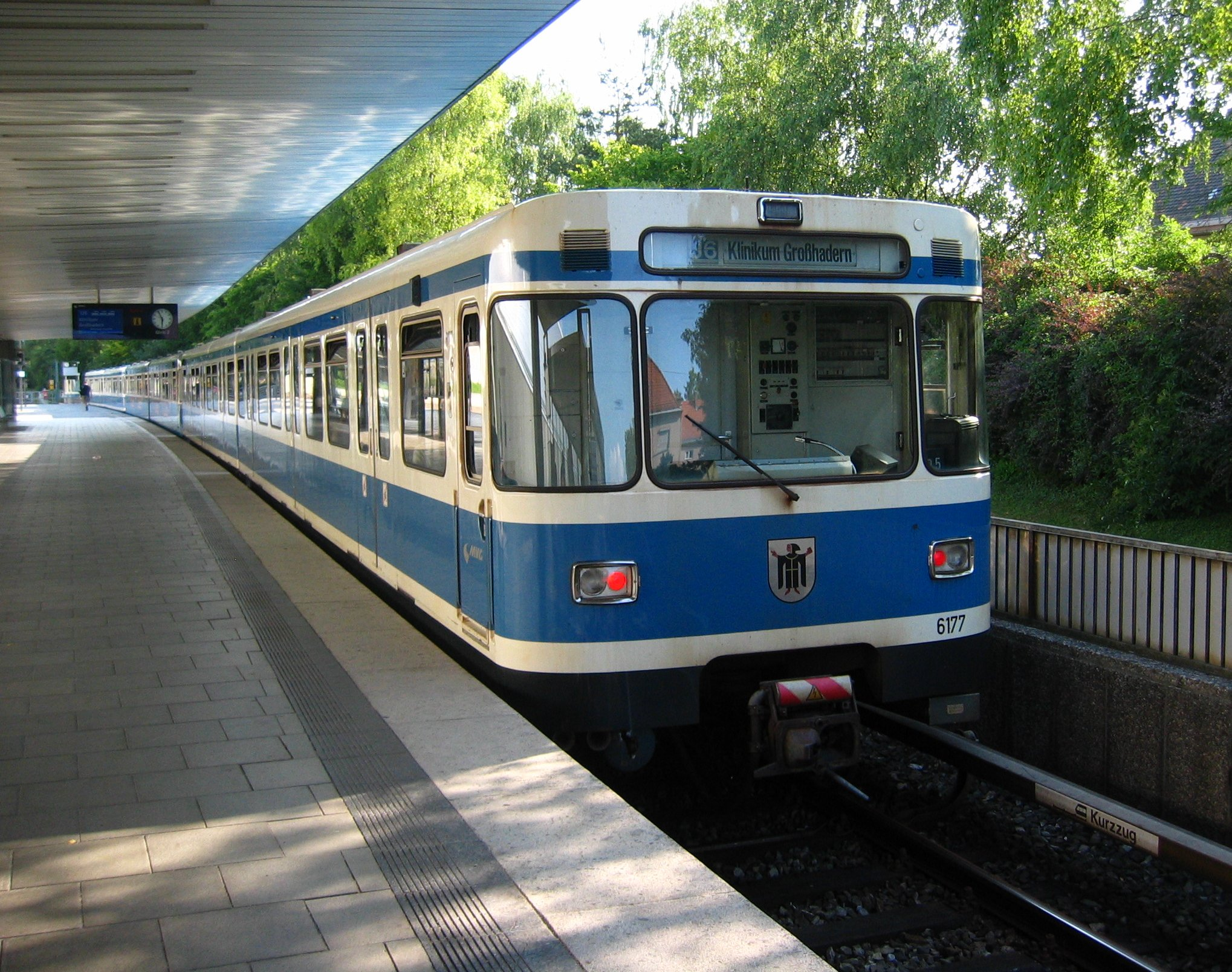
U-bahn train at Freimann station

Public transport in Munich

- Public transport operators
  - Münchner Verkehrs- und Tarifverbund (MVV)

Air transport in Munich

- Airports in Munich
  - Munich Airport

==== Rail transport in Munich ====
- Munich S-Bahn
- Munich U-Bahn
  - List of Munich U-Bahn stations
    - München Hauptbahnhof
- Trams in Munich

==== Road transport in Munich ====
- Bus transport in Munich
  - Zentraler Omnibusbahnhof München
- Car sharing in Munich
  - DriveNow
- Cycling in Munich
  - Call a Bike
- Roads in Munich
  - Outer Ring

== Education in Munich ==
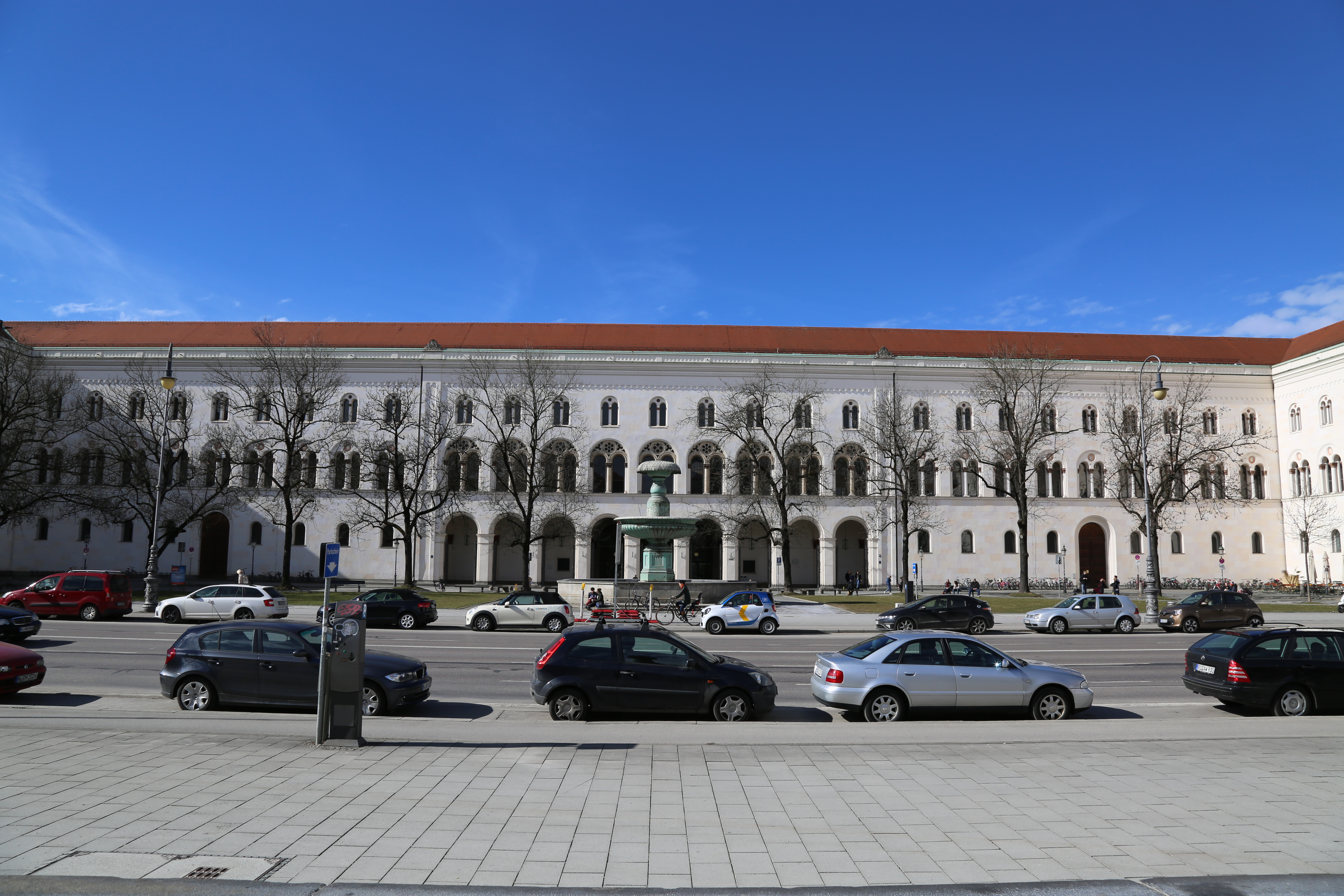
LMU Munich, one of Germany's most prestigious universities

Education in Munich

- Academy of Fine Arts
- University of the Bundeswehr Munich
- University of Music and Theatre Munich
- LMU Munich
- Munich Business School
- Munich School of Philosophy
- Munich University of Applied Sciences
- Technical University of Munich
- University of Television and Film Munich

Research institutes in Munich

- European Southern Observatory
- Ifo Institute for Economic Research
- Max Planck Institute for Astrophysics

== Healthcare in Munich ==
Hospitals in Munich

- Klinikum Großhadern
- Rechts der Isar Hospital

== See also ==
- Outline of geography
