= Maxvorstadt =

Borough of Munich

Coordinates: 48°09′00″N 11°34′10″E

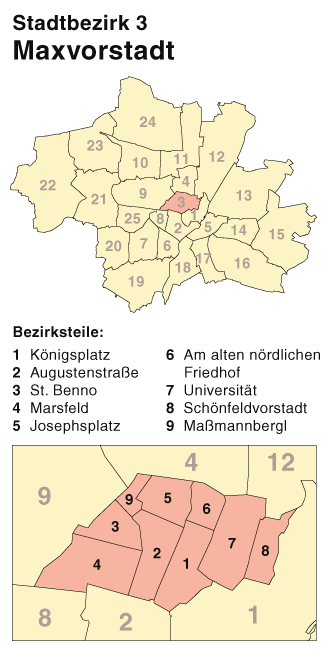

Maxvorstadt (German pronunciation: [ˈmaksˌfoːɐ̯ʃtat]; Central Bavarian: Maxvorstod) is a central borough of Munich, Bavaria, Germany and forms the Stadtbezirk (borough) 3 Maxvorstadt. Since 1992, this borough comprises the former boroughs 5, 6 and 7 (Maxvorstadt-Universität, Maxvorstadt-Königsplatz-Marsfeld and Maxvorstadt-Josephsplatz).

== Location ==
The borough is next to the north-western part of the Old City. The Englischer Garten is the Eastern border, Schwabing is in the North, Neuhausen-Nymphenburg in the North-West. The borough Schwanthalerhöhe is its south-western neighbor and Ludwigsvorstadt-Isarvorstadt is in the south. The Eastern parts of Maxvorstadt are often mistakenly attributed to the borough of Schwabing.

== Traffic ==
The Maxvorstadt is drafted as a quadratical grid and is shaped by the north-south axes Schleißheimer Straße and Ludwigstraße; the parallel streets Amalienstraße, Türkenstraße, Barer Straße, Schraudolphstraße, Arcisstraße, Luisenstraße and Augustenstraße run between them. These two main streets are linked by the east-west connections Gabelsbergerstraße, Theresienstraße, Heßstraße, Schellingstraße, Zieblandstraße, Görresstraße and Georgenstraße, Theresienstraße and Gabelsbergerstraße are one-way streets.

The Maxvorstadt is accessible by public transport by the underground line U2 and the stations Königsplatz, Theresienstraße and Josephsplatz, the underground lines U3 and U6 and the station Universität and also the underground line U1 and the station Stiglmaierplatz. Additionally, the tram lines 16, 17, 20, 21, 27 and 28 as well as several bus lines are running here.

== History ==
Maxvorstadt was conceived as the first planned urban expansion between 1805 and 1810 under the first Bavarian king, Maximilian I. Joseph , after whom it is named. However, it was largely built after 1825 under Ludwig I in Neoclassical style. Richard-Wagner-Straße , with the State School of Applied Arts (now the Bavarian State Collection for Paleontology and Geology), is still largely preserved in its original form. Ludwigstraße, running from the Feldherrnhalle to the Siegestor (Victory Gate) , was the first street laid out. The boundary with the Old Town is roughly marked by Brienner Straße .

== Notable landmarks ==
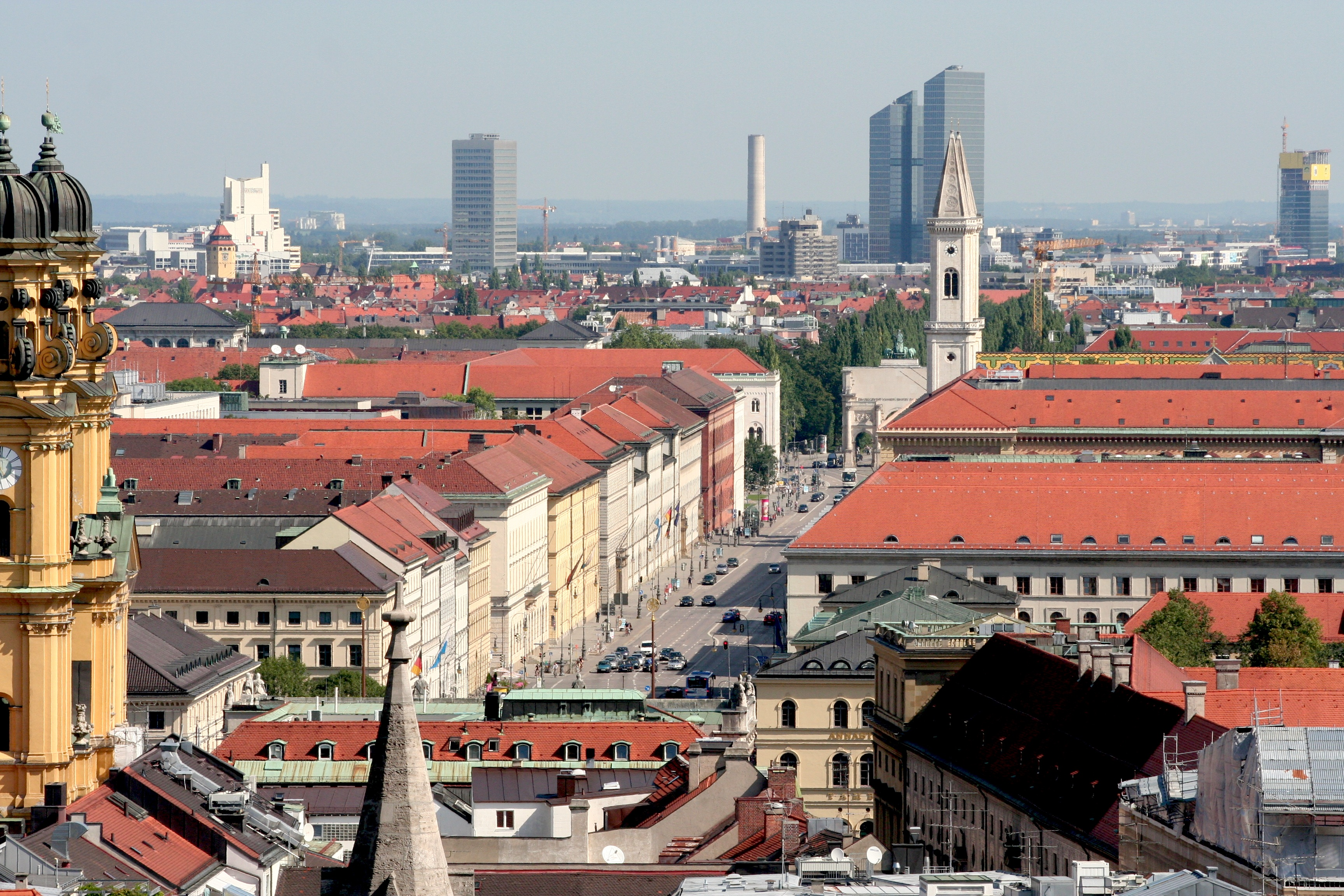
Ludwigstraße in Maxvorstadt

- 8. November 1939 (Denkmal)
- Abtei St. Bonifaz (Munich)
- Akademie der Bildenden Künste München
- Akademiegalerie
- Alter Botanischer Garten (Munich)
- Alter Nordfriedhof (Munich)
- Altstadtring
- Altstadtringtunnel
- Amerikanisches Generalkonsulat in München
- Architekturmuseum der Technischen Universität München
- Arnold & Richter Cine Technik
- Bahnhof München Hackerbrücke
- Bayerische Staatskanzlei
- Bayerisches Kriegsministerium
- Bennosäule
- Bernheimer-Haus
- Braunes Haus
- Bundestagswahlkreis München-Nord
- Dachauer Straße
- Delphinbrunnen (Munich)
- Denkmal für Franz Xaver Gabelsberger (Munich)
- Dichtergarten (Munich)
- Die Neue Sammlung
- Führerbau
- Gabriel Filmtheater
- Geologisches Museum München
- Glaspalast (Munich)
- Hackerbrücke
- Harmlos
- Hochschule für Musik und Theater München
- Hochschule für Philosophie München
- Hochschule für Politik München
- Hofbrunnwerkkanal
- Hofgartenkaserne
- Institut français (Munich)
- Justizpalast (Munich)
- Kaim-Saal
- Karstadt München Bahnhofplatz
- Kleines Spiel
- Königliche Kunstgewerbeschule München
- Königsplatz (Munich)
- Circus Krone
- Kronebau
- Kunstsammlung des Herzoglichen Georgianums
- Landeskirchenamt München
- Lenbachplatz
- Löwenbräukeller
- Maillingerstraße
- Marsfeld (Munich)
- Max-Planck-Institut für Sozialrecht und Sozialpolitik
- Münchner Haus der Kulturinstitute
- Münchner Theater für Kinder
- Museum für Abgüsse Klassischer Bildwerke
- Neptunbrunnen (Munich)
- Nornenbrunnen (Munich)
- NS-Dokumentationszentrum
- Odeon (Munich)
- Odeonsplatz
- Erich Ott
- Prinz-Carl-Palais
- Propyläen (Munich)
- Richard-Wagner-Straße (Munich)
- Rundfunkplatz
- Salzstadelkaserne
- Schauspiel München
- Schelling-Salon
- Schleißheimer Straße (Munich)
- Siegestor
- SiemensForum München
- Simpl (Munich)
- SportA
- Sprachen & Dolmetscher Institut München
- St. Benno, Munich
- St. Joseph (Munich)
- St. Markus (Munich)
- St.-Benno-Viertel
- Staatliche Antikensammlungen
- Staatsarchiv München
- Städtische Galerie im Lenbachhaus
- Städtisches Luisengymnasium München
- Stimmkreis München-Schwabing
- The Charles Hotel
- Theater Die Kleine Freiheit
- TheaterRaum München
- Türkengraben
- Türkenkaserne
- U-Bahnhof Josephsplatz
- U-Bahnhof Königsplatz
- U-Bahnhof Stiglmaierplatz
- U-Bahnhof Theresienstraße
- Winzererstraße
- Wittelsbacher-Gymnasium München
- Wittelsbacherbrunnen (Lenbachplatz)
- Wohnhaus Reinemann
- Wohnheimsiedlung Maßmannplatz
- Zentraler Omnibusbahnhof München
