= Hofbrunnwerkkanal =

Canal in Munich, Germany

Hofbrunnwerkkanal is located in Maxvorstadt, Munich, Bavaria, Germany.

The Hofbrunnwerkkanal is a canal that supplies the Hofbrunnwerk on the northern edge of the Munich Hofgarten with water to drive its turbines. The channel is part of the system of Munich's city.

== History ==
The Hofbrunnwerkkanal is about 410 m long, 1.17 m wide and 0.58 m deep. It has an average water volume of 600 L/s and has a slope of about 1.2%.

The canal is diverted from the Westliche Stadtgrabenbach in front of the middle of the north wing of the Residenz, runs further underground through the Hofgarten to its Nordostecke and then east to Hofbrunnwerk.

After driving the turbines, the water flows further underground to the north-east under the Harmloswiese and between Prinz-Carl-Palais and Köglmühlbach to the pedestrian underpass under the Altstadtring. There, it flows in a trough covered with grates and flows into the Schwabinger Bach beginning there underneath a waterfall at the beginning of the English garden.

Already for the first Hofbrunnwerk, erected in 1562, a canal had been laid, which presumably branched off from the Weststadtgrabenbach. The canal with its present course was built around 1845, when the old Brunnwerk was demolished at the Residenz and rebuilt next to the Hofbrunnwerk.

In 1968, the Hofbrunnwerkkanal was abandoned as it stood in the way of the construction of the Altstadtring, and the Hofbrunnwerk was closed down. As part of the reconstruction of the old Bavarian State Chancellery, where the Köglmühlbach was rebuilt next to its original bed, the Hofbrunnwerkkanal and the Hofbrunnwerk were restored in Operation.
