= Museum Lichtspiele =

Film theater in Munich

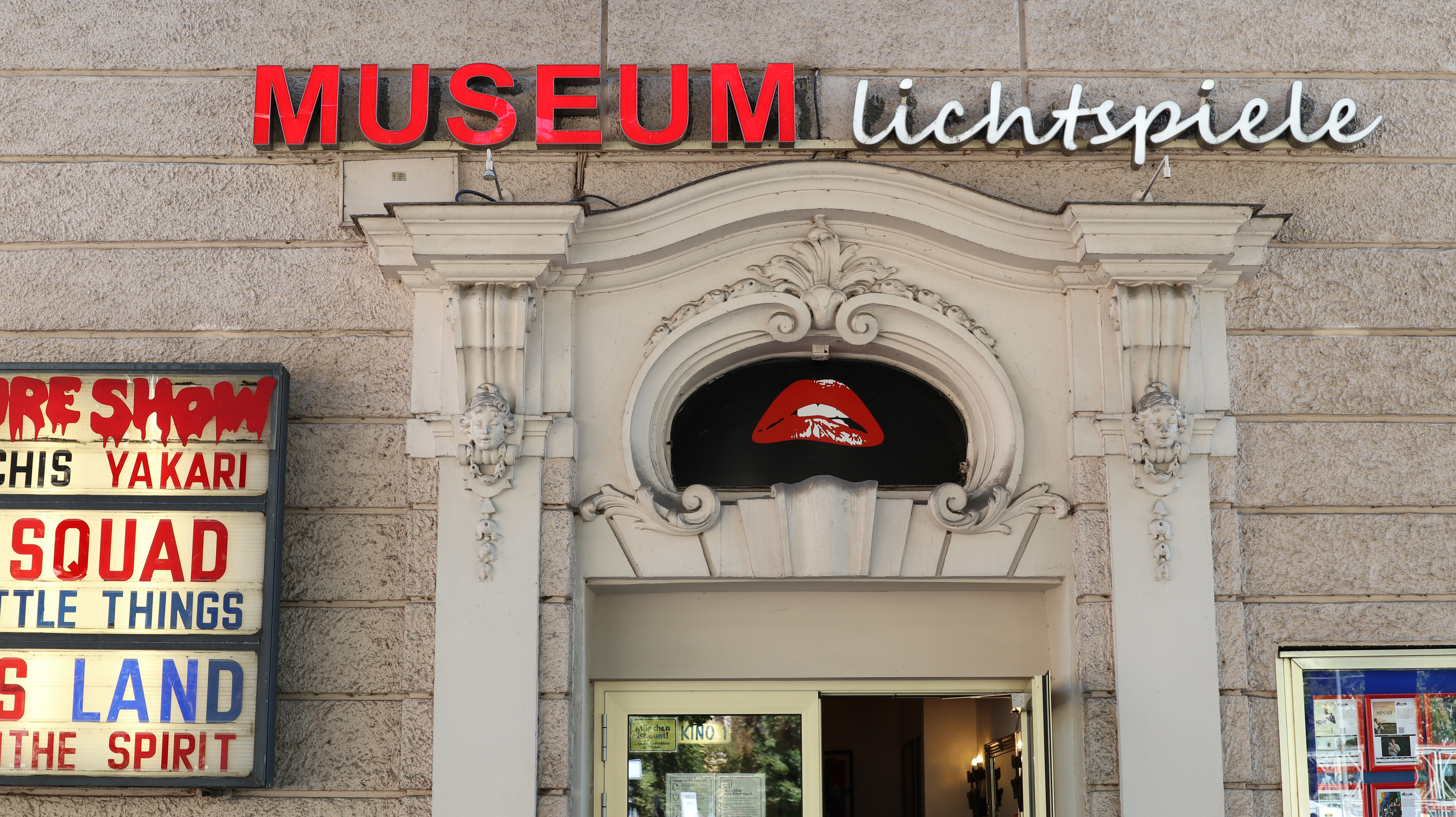
- Interactive map of Museum Lichtspiele
- Former names: Gabriels Tonbildtheater (until 1918)
- Location: Lilienstraße 2 Munich, Germany
- Coordinates: 48°07′51″N 11°35′15″E
- Owner: MuLi Muc GmbH
- Capacity: 280
- Type: Movie theater

Construction
- Built: 1910
- Opened: 24 November 1910
- Renovated: 2013

Website
- www.museum-lichtspiele.de

The Museum Lichtspiele (German: [muˈzeːʊm ˈlɪçtˌʃpiːlə]) is a movie theater in Munich, Germany. It is situated in the district Au next to the Deutsches Museum and along the Isar bank.

Established in 1910, it is Munich's oldest still operational movie theater and known for showing English-language blockbusters and art movies, as well as The Rocky Horror Picture Show since its 1977 premiere in Germany.

== History ==
The cinema was established in 1910 by German actor and businessman Carl Gabriel, who had previously built Gabriel Filmtheater among cinemas in all of Germany. It replaced the previous restaurant Zum Kaisergarten and operated for 8 years under the name Gabriels Tonbildtheater until adopting its current popular name to reflect the proximity to the Deutsches Museum.

The building saw a much-needed renovation in the summer of 2013, which involved renewing the electricity and air conditioning to comply with new fire protection regulations. The cinema reopened in October of the same year with the movie The Butler.

== Program ==
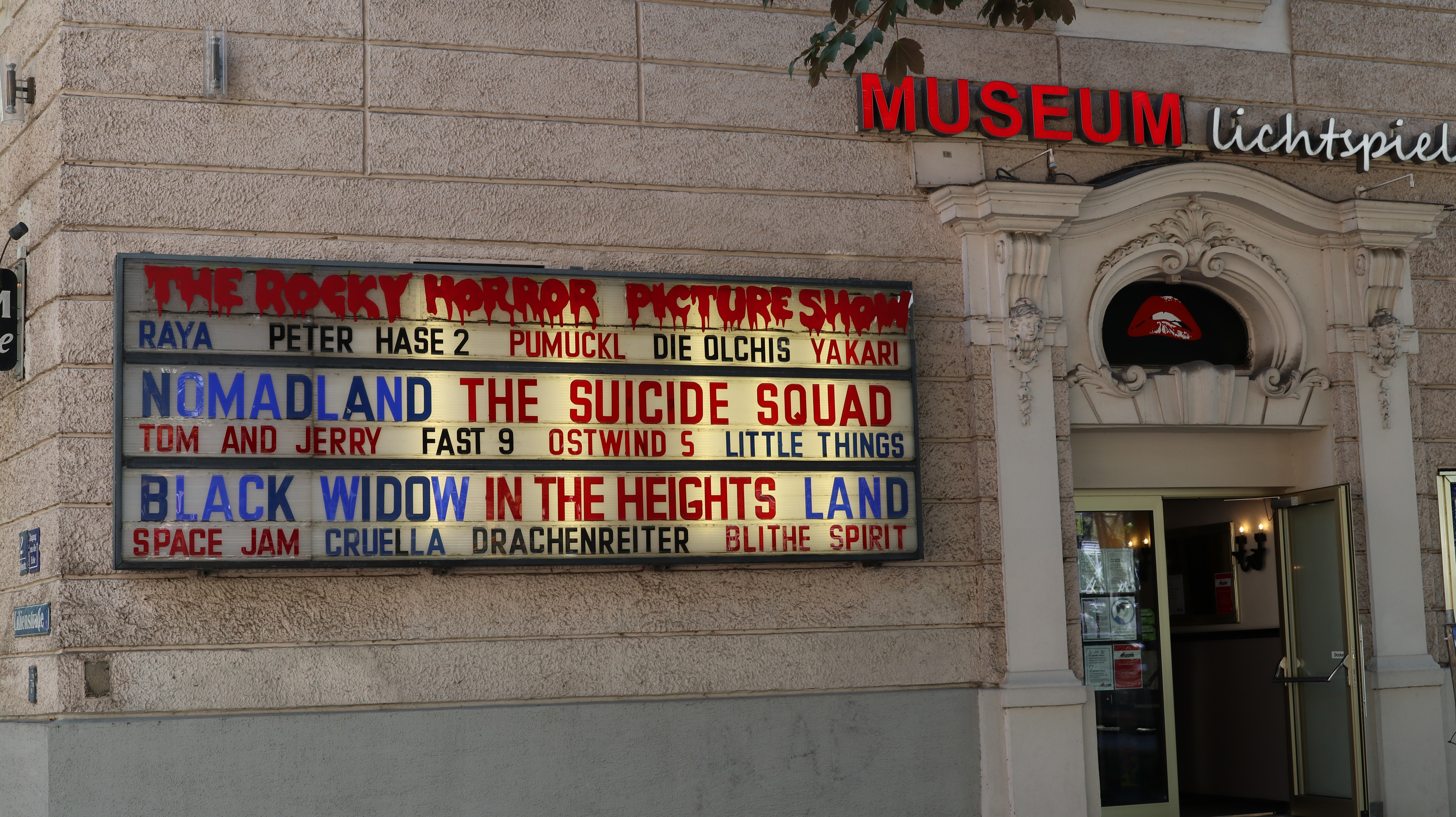
The movie theater's marquee in August 2021

In four auditoria, Museum Lichtspiele shows a number of international movies and blockbusters in English, plus locally produced or dubbed children's movies in German.

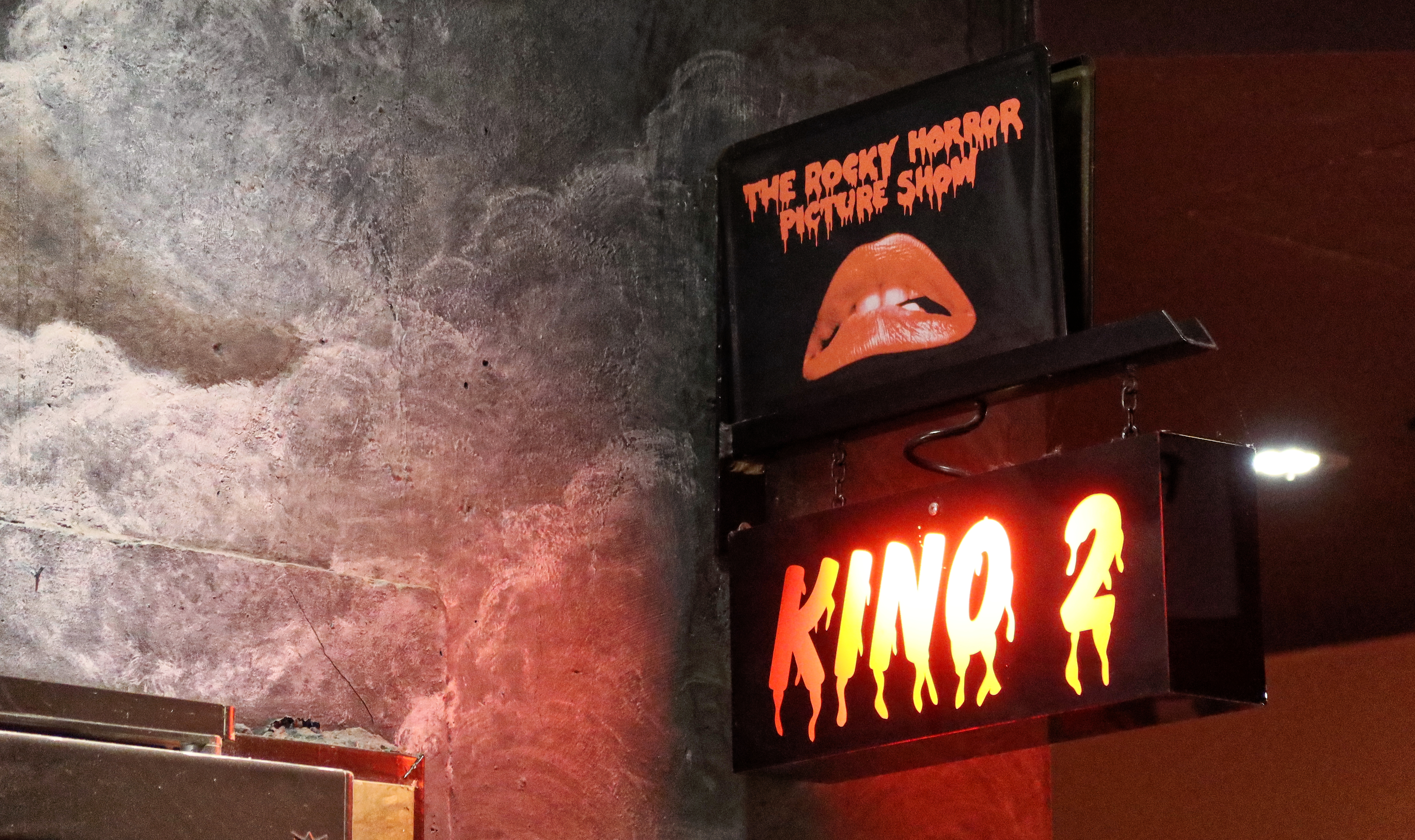
Auditorium 2 showing The Rocky Horror Picture Show

However, it is most well known for its traditional showings of the cult-classic The Rocky Horror Picture Show each Friday and Saturday night in the uniquely decorated auditorium 2. Since its debut in 1977, Rocky Horror has become one of the primary pieces of merchandise and was widely celebrated on its 40-year anniversary in 2017. It is still running as of 2023 and remains one of the theater's most reliable sources of income.
