= Enrico Berti =

Italian philosopher (1935–2022)

Enrico Berti (3 November 1935 – 5 January 2022) was an Italian historian of philosophy. He was professor emeritus of history of ancient philosophy at the University of Padua.

== Biography ==
Born in Valeggio sul Mincio, Italy, Berti graduated in philosophy in 1957 at the University of Padua, and after a few years teaching at the University of Perugia he was professor in his alma mater for almost forty years. His major interest was Aristotle, to whom he dedicated many works, and of whom he made his own translation of the Metaphysics, published in 2017.

During his life Berti has received numerous honors, including the title of Academician of Lincei and the appointment of Grand Officer of the Order of Merit of the Republic. His Storia della filosofia. Dall’antichità a oggi ("History of Philosophy. From antiquity to today") is used as the manual of philosophy in many Italian schools and universities. Berti died on 5 January 2022, at the age of 86.

== Thought ==
Berti proposed a systematic classification of the metaphysics that appeared in the history of philosophy. He proposed a differentiation between immanentistic metaphysics and transcendentistic metaphysics.

The immanentist metaphysics find the ultimate cause of the world of experience within the latter. They are divided in turn into naturalistic, materialistic and idealistic metaphysics. The naturalistic metaphysics are those of the Presocratics, Heraclitus and the Renaissance metaphysics of Telesio and Giordano Bruno. Materialistic metaphysics are those of Leucippus and Democritus and, in Modern philosophy, La Mettrie, Helvetius, Marx and Engels. Idealistic metaphysics are those according to which "everything derives from the Idea, Consciousness, Reason, Thought, pure Ego, Absolute Spirit" and are those of Fichte, Schelling, Hegel and Giovanni Gentile.

Transcendentist metaphysics postulate that the ultimate cause of the world of experience is outside it: it may be found in nature, matter or in the eidos. Transcendentist metaphysics are in turn divided into metaphysics of participation and metaphysics of experience. According to the metaphysics of participation, entities possess a character or perfection of the first principle in an imperfect and partial form, because they are derived from it. Examples of those metaphysics are the philosophies of Plato, the Neoplatonists, St. Augustine, Saint Thomas Aquinas for some aspects (the basic distinction between ens per essentiam of God the Creator and ens per partecipationem of creatures), the later Fichte and the later Schelling, Antonio Rosmini and Vincenzo Gioberti.

In the metaphysics of experience, philosophy takes on the task of demonstrating with as much rigor as possible the necessity of a transcendent principle, considering it in itself not self-evident. Belonging to this paradigm are the philosophy of Aristotle, St. Thomas Aquinas (in the Five Ways) and Gustavo Bontadini, author of the volume Saggio di una metafisica dell'esperienza (Essay on a Metaphysics of Experience).

== Publications ==
- L'interpretazione neoumanistica della filosofia presocratica, Padova, 1959.
- La filosofia del primo Aristotele, Padova, Cedam, 1962; 2ª ed., Milano, Vita e Pensiero, 1997.
- Il "De republica" di Cicerone e il pensiero politico classico, Padova, Cedam, 1963.
- L'unità del sapere in Aristotele, Padova, Cedam, 1965.
- La contraddizione, 1967.
- Studi sulla struttura logica del discorso scientifico, 1968.
- Studi aristotelici, L'Aquila, Japadre, 1975 (nuova edizione, 2012).
- Aristotele. Dalla dialettica alla filosofia prima, Padova, Cedam, 1977.
- Ragione scientifica e ragione filosofica nel pensiero moderno, Roma, La Goliardica, 1977.
- Profilo di Aristotele, Roma, Studium, 1979.
- Il bene, Brescia, La Scuola, 1983.
- Le vie della ragione, Bologna, Il Mulino, 1987.
- Contraddizione e dialettica negli antichi e nei moderni, Palermo, L'Epos, 1987 (nuova edizione, 2015).
- Le ragioni di Aristotele, Roma-Bari, Laterza, 1989.
- Storia della filosofia. Dall'antichità a oggi (with Franco Volpi), Roma-Bari, Laterza, 1991.
- Aristotele nel Novecento, Roma-Bari, Laterza, 1992.
- Introduzione alla metafisica, Torino, UTET, 1993.
- Il pensiero politico di Aristotele, Roma-Bari, Laterza, 1997.
- (curatore, con Cristina Rossitto) Aristotele e altri autori, Divisioni, con testo greco a fronte, coll. Il pensiero occidentale, 2005.
- Struttura e significato della metafisica di Aristotele, Roma, Edusc, 2006.
- In principio era la meraviglia. Le grandi questioni della filosofia antica, Roma-Bari, Laterza, 2007.
- Dialectique, physique et métaphysique. Études sur Aristote, Peeters, 2008.
- Il libro primo della «Metafisica» (con Cristina Rossitto), traduzione di Antonio Russo, Roma-Bari, Laterza, 2008.
- Sumphilosophein. La vita nell'Accademia di Platone, Roma-Bari, Laterza, 2010.
- Nuovi studi aristotelici, 4 voll., Brescia, Morcelliana, 2004-2010.
- Invito alla filosofia, Brescia, La Scuola, 2011.
- La ricerca della verità in filosofia, Roma, Studium, 2014.
- Aristotelismo, Bologna, il Mulino, 2017.
