= Harmlos =

Coordinates: 48°08′37″N 11°34′56″E

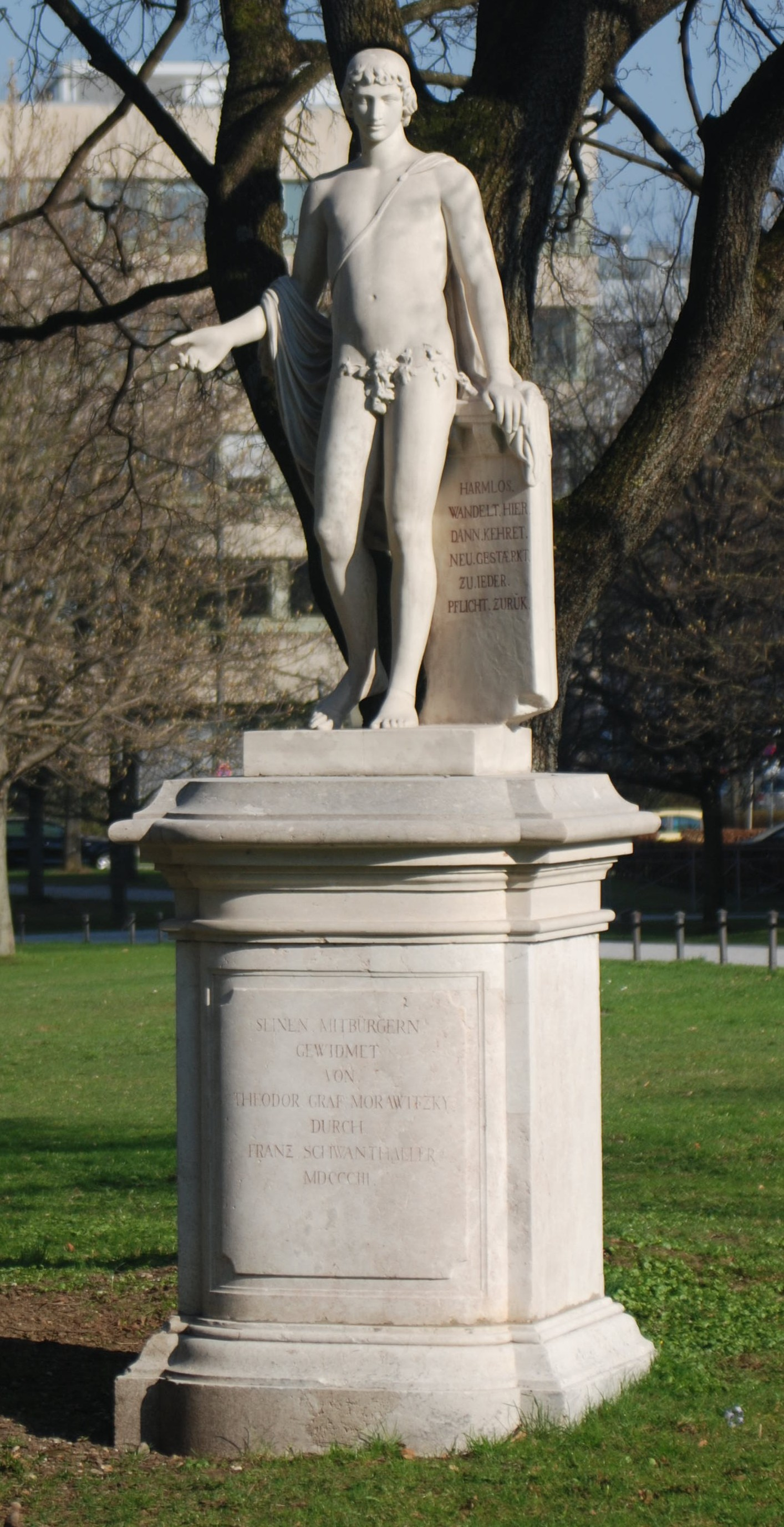
Statue of Harmlos at the Prinz-Carl-Palais by Franz Jakob Schwanthaler

Harmlos is located in Maxvorstadt, Munich, Bavaria, Germany.

Inscription reads:

HARMLOS
WANDELT HIER
DAN KEHRET.
NEU GESTÄRKT.
ZU JEDER
PFLICHT ZURÜCK.

Media related to Harmlos at Wikimedia Commons
