= Paul Schneider-Esleben =

German architect

- Born: Paul Maximilian Heinrich Schneider; 28 August 1915; Düsseldorf, Kingdom of Prussia (now Germany)
- Died: 19 May 2005 (aged 89); Tegernsee, Germany
- Occupation: Architect
- Spouses: Evamaria van Diemen-Meyerhof (m. 1946–1995) Anne Müller (m. 1996)
- Children: 3, including Florian
- Website: paul.schneider-esleben.de

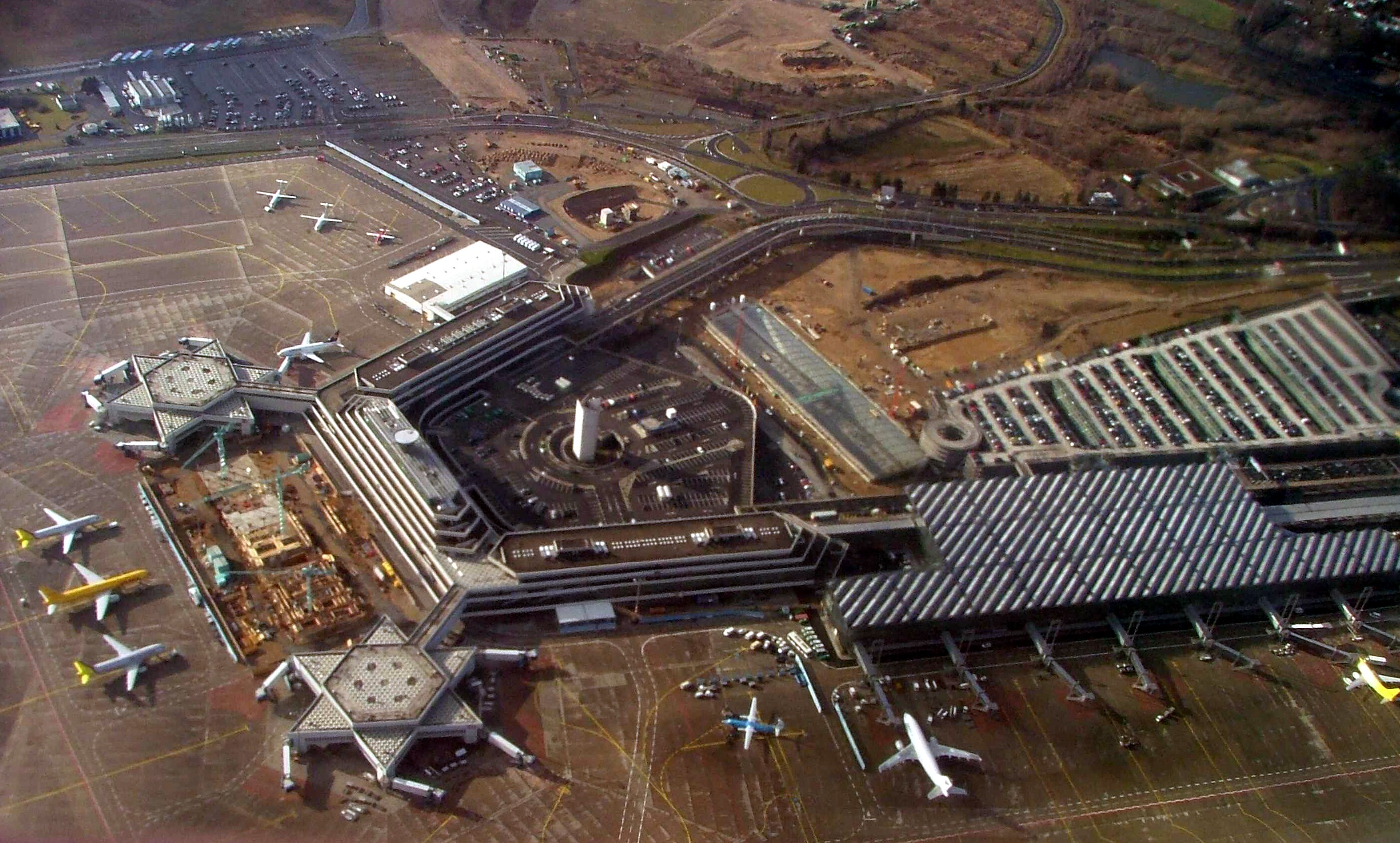
Cologne Bonn Airport, designed by Schneider-Esleben 1962–1970

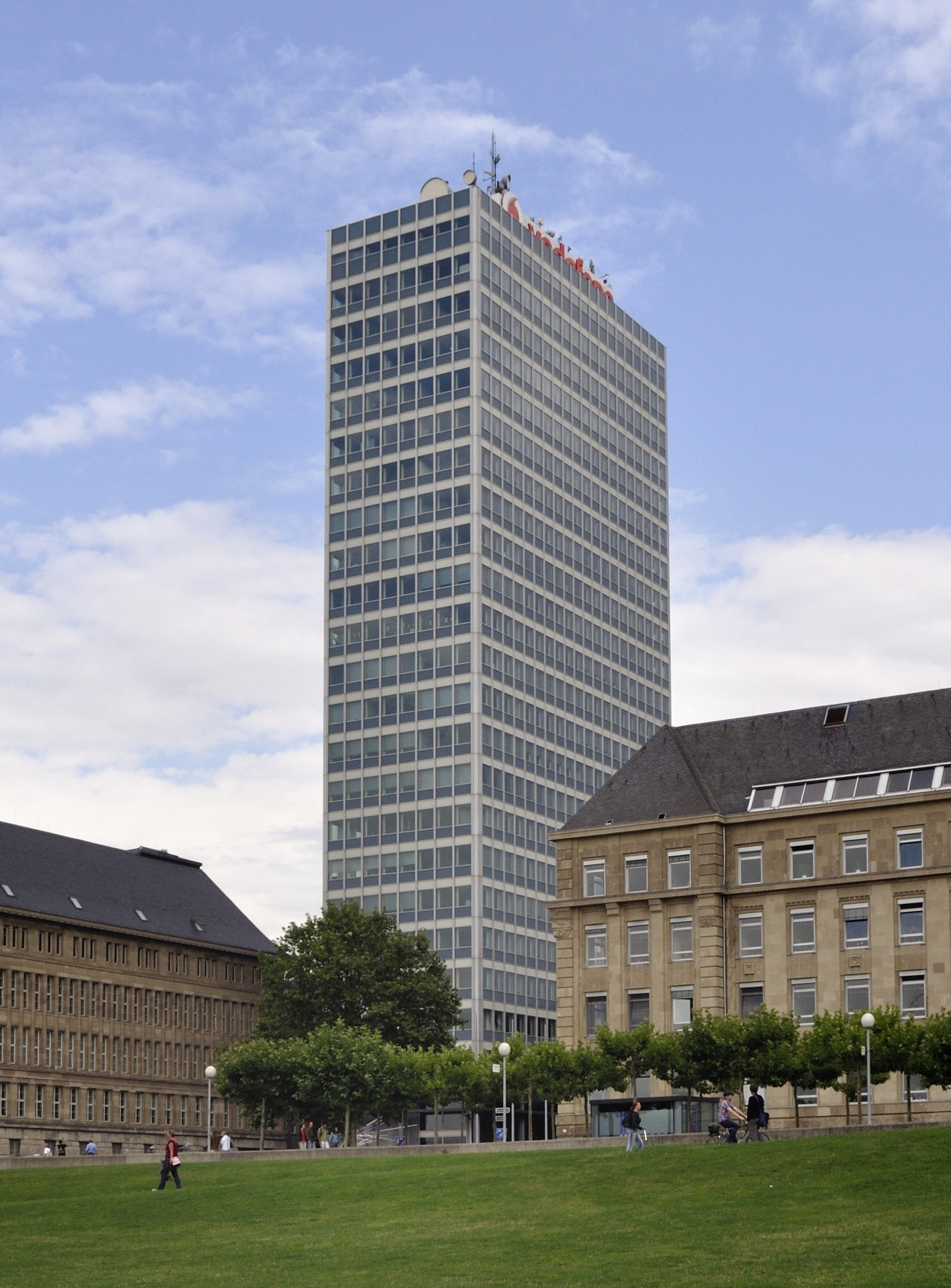
Mannesmann-Hochhaus, designed by Schneider-Esleben 1955

Paul Maximilian Heinrich Schneider von Esleben (née Schneider, 28 August 1915 – 19 May 2005), known as Paul Schneider-Esleben, was a German architect who worked in the modernist movement, mostly on airports, throughout the 1960s.

== Early life ==
Paul Schneider was born in 1915 in Düsseldorf to Maria Anna Elisabeth (née Esleben, 1881–1950) and Franz Leonhard Schneider (1877–1948), an architect, as the second of seven siblings and was raised Catholic.

Before completing his secondary school Abitur, he worked at his father's architectural practice and went on to study architecture at the University of Applied Sciences Stuttgart in 1937. He graduated in 1947; from 1939 to 1945 he suspended his studies to participate in the Second World War. In the 1940s, Schneider changed his surname to include his mother's maiden name.

== Career ==
Schneider-Esleben opened an architectural firm in Düsseldorf in 1949. His early designs, including the Hanielgarage—a multi-storey carpark constructed in 1951, and the building that made him famous—followed the principles of the New Objectivity movement of the 1920s. In 1955 he won a competition to design the expansion of Mannesmann-Hochhaus, Mannesmann's head office in Düsseldorf, which was the first German building to be constructed with a steel frame structure and curtain walls. He worked with artist members of Zero—Günther Uecker, Heinz Mack, Josef Piene and Joseph Beuys—in 1957–1961 to design the Rolandschule. From 1962 to 1970 he oversaw the redesign of the Cologne Bonn Airport into a layout that was adopted by numerous other international airports and led to his being hired as a consultant to architectural projects for many worldwide airports.

Schneider-Esleben was a professor at the Hochschule für bildende Künste Hamburg from 1961 until 1972 as well as a visiting professor of the Vienna University of Technology in 1965. He was also a furniture designer, and often created specific furniture designs for his buildings, such as the "PSE 58" chair.

Schneider-Esleben's work slowed in the 1970s as his modernist style became outdated in favour of postmodernism. He died in Tegernsee in 2005, aged 89.

== Recognition and impact ==
Schneider-Esleben is credited as an influential figure in the post-World War II modernist architectural movement in Germany. An obituary published by Deutschlandfunk described him as a pioneer of modern architecture. He received the North Rhine-Westphalia State Prize for Architecture in 1956, the Order of Merit of the Federal Republic of Germany in 1968 and 1987, and an honorary doctorate from RWTH Aachen University in 1993.

In 2015, a retrospective of Schneider-Esleben's work was exhibited at the Architekturmuseum der Technischen Universität München, as part of the Pinakothek der Moderne in Munich. The exhibition marked the centenary of his birth.

== Family ==
Schneider-Esleben married Evamaria van Diemen-Meyerhof (1922–2007), a writer of Jewish descent, in 1946, against the will of his father, who remained a loyal Nazi. They had three children: Florian (1947–2020), one of the founding members of electronic music pioneers Kraftwerk, Claudia (b. 1949), architect and designer, and Maria Katherina (1955–2002), graphic artist. After separating in 1995, Schneider-Esleben remarried to Anne Margarete Müller (b. 1942), an installation consultant, the following year.
