= Institut français (disambiguation) =

Institut français is a French-government funded industrial and commercial institution promoting French culture overseas.

It has numerous branches around the world, including -

- Institut français (Munich)
- Institut français de Vienne

Not to be confused with the languages school Alliance française.

Institut français may also refer to:

- Institut Français (Marrakesh), a performing arts institution in Marrakesh

== See also ==
- Institut Français d'Afrique Noire, a cultural and scientific institute in the nations of the former French West Africa
- Institut Français d'Archéologie Orientale, a French research institute based in Cairo, Egypt
- Institut français d'opinion publique, an international marketing firm
- Institut Français de Recherche en Iran, an archaeological and historical institute in Tehran
- Institut français des relations internationales, independent research and debate institution dedicated to international affairs, based in Paris, France
- Institut français du pétrole, a public research organisation in France
- Institut français du Proche-Orient, part of the network of French Research Centres abroad
- Institut français Léopold Sédar Senghor, a Dakar-based organizational body dedicated to the diffusion of French culture in Senegal
