= Rundfunkplatz =

Square in Munich, Germany

Coordinates: 48°08′38″N 11°33′19″E

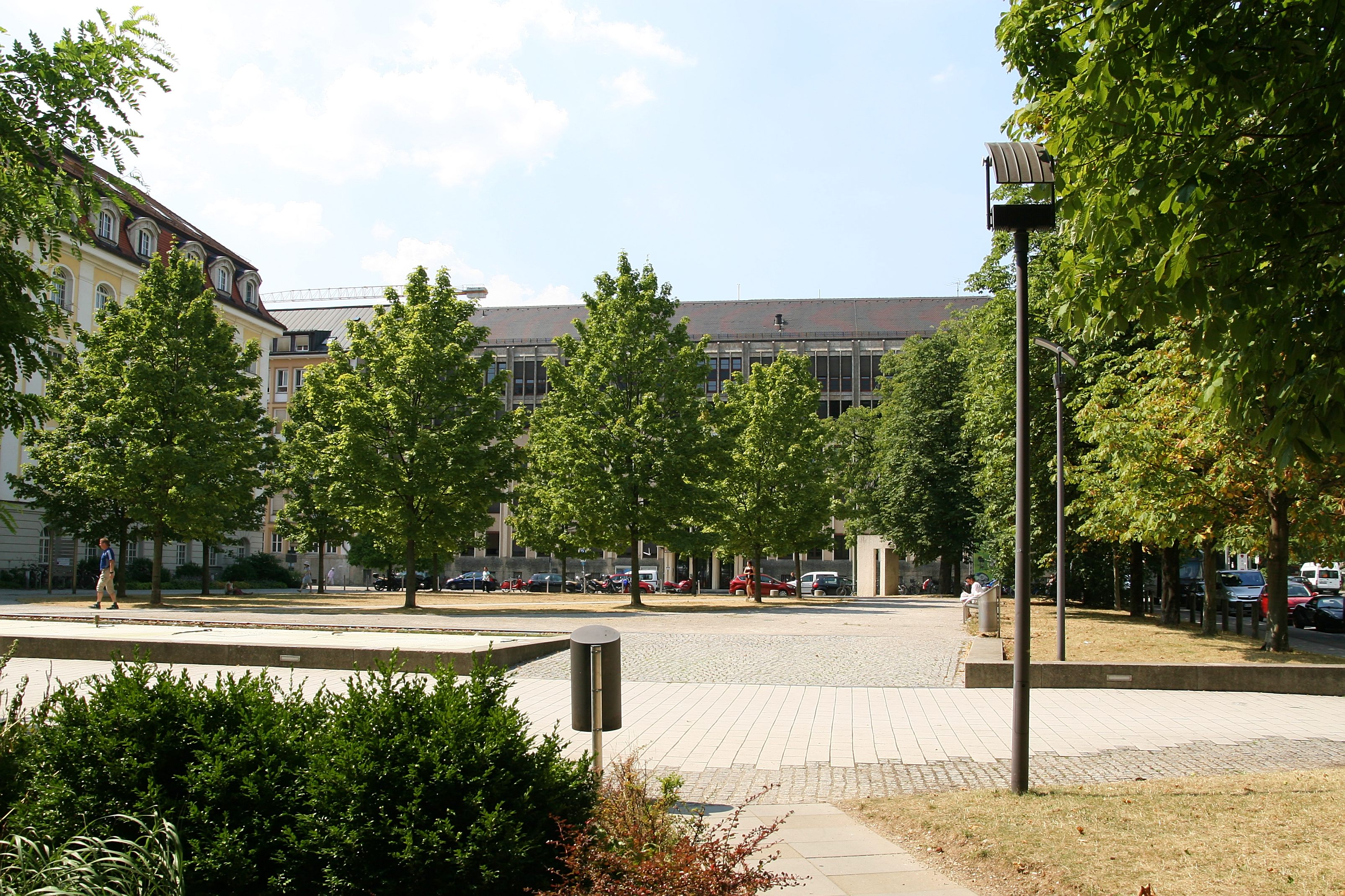
Rundfunkplatz gesamtansicht

Rundfunkplatz is located in Maxvorstadt, Munich, Bavaria, Germany.
