= Kunstsammlung des Herzoglichen Georgianums =

Coordinates: 48.149969°N 11.581922°E

Kunstsammlung des Herzoglichen Georgianums is located in Maxvorstadt, Munich, Bavaria, Germany.
