= Schelling-Salon =

Building in Munich, Germany

Coordinates: 48°09′04″N 11°34′23″E

Schelling-Salon is a pub located in Schellingstraße 54, Maxvorstadt, Munich, Bavaria, Germany. It was founded and purchased by the family Mehr and is still run by them.

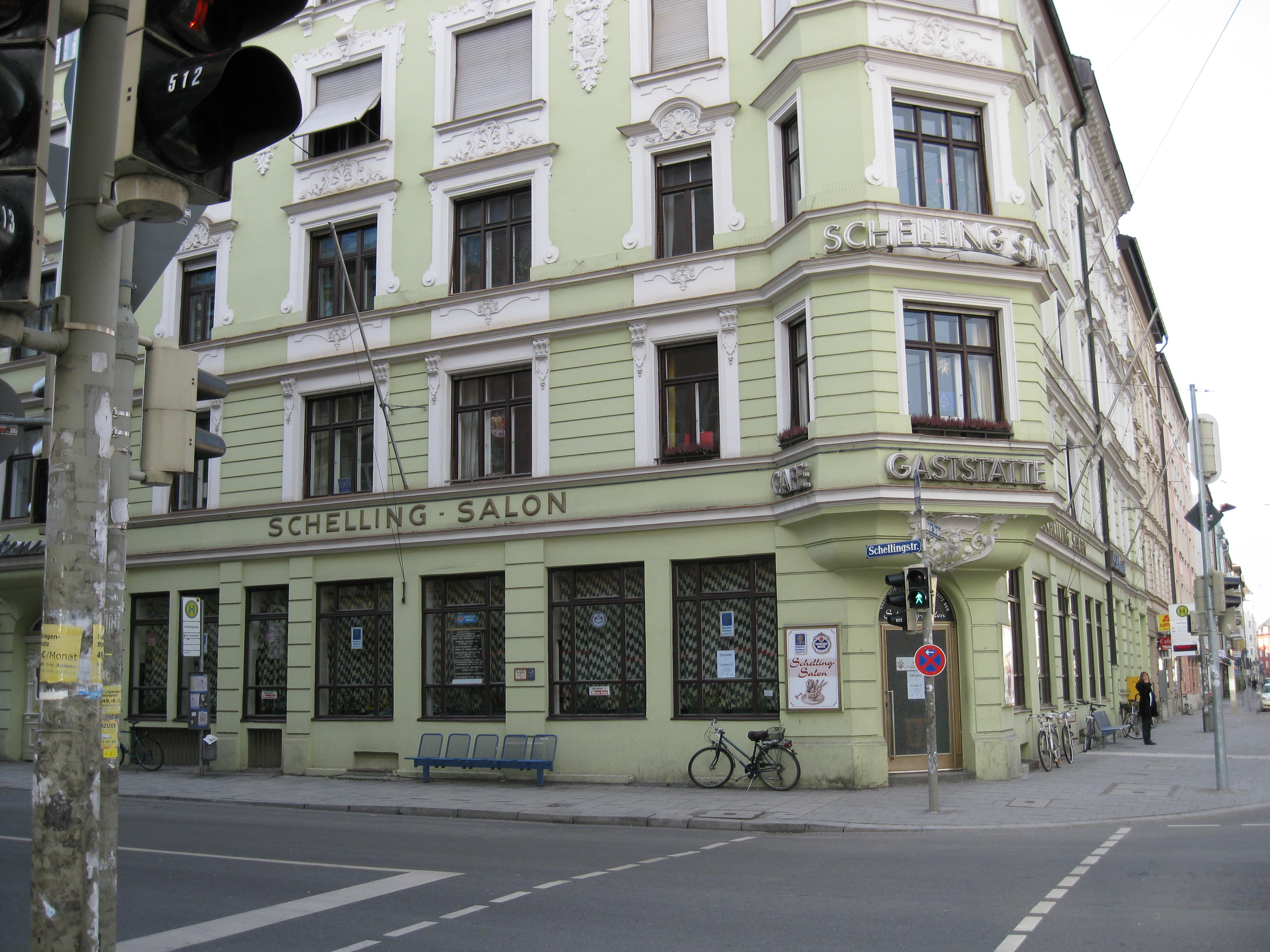
Picture of the Schelling Salon taken by Cholo Aleman

== History ==
In 1872, Silvester and Fridoline Mehr purchased the then called Herrmann's Salon and they barkeepers until their son took over of the business in 1911. From 1904 to 1911 Silvester Mehr was also President of the innkeepers association of Bavaria. Their son Engelbert and his wife Elisabeth turned the business into a viennese style café and they managed to run the business through both World War I and World War II. The next owners were Silvester and Maria Mehr, who ran the pub until Silvester's death in 2002. During their time, a big focus was set onto chess and pool billiard. Since 2002, Evelin Mehr is the sole owner of the Schelling-Salon.

== Notable Guests ==
The Schelling-Salon had many notable guests including Bertolt Brecht, Wassily Kandinsky, Ödön von Horváth, Rainer Maria Rilke, Vladimir Lenin and Adolf Hitler, who was kicked out and moved on to the Osteria Italiana due to unpaid checks at the Schelling-Salon. Franz Josef Strauß also visited the pub to get beer for his father during his adolescence. It is also the place where Rote Armee Fraktion terrorist Andreas Baader met Bild columnist Franz Josef Wagner.
