= Karstadt München Bahnhofplatz =

Department store in Munich, Bavaria, Germany

Coordinates: 48°08′26″N 11°33′43″E

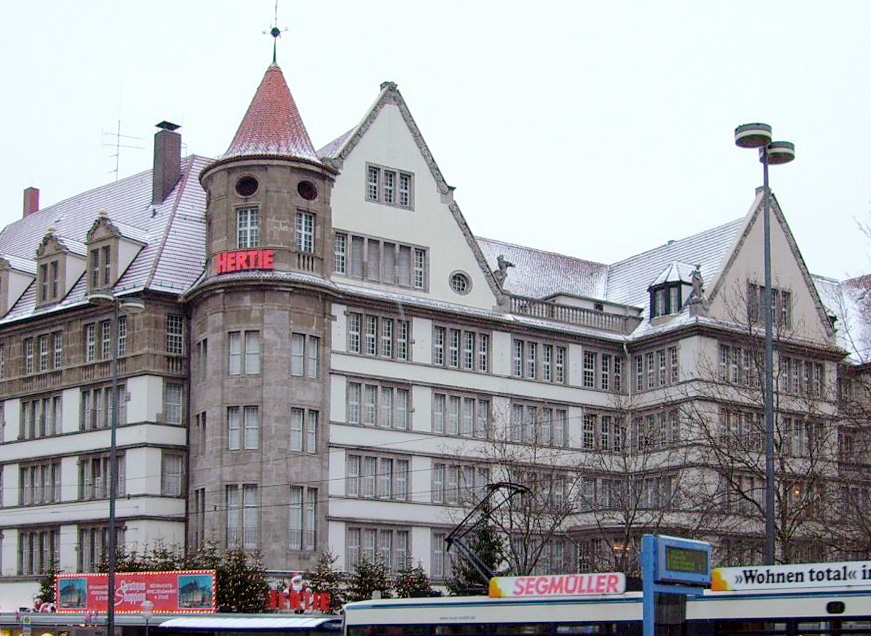
The department store before changing name

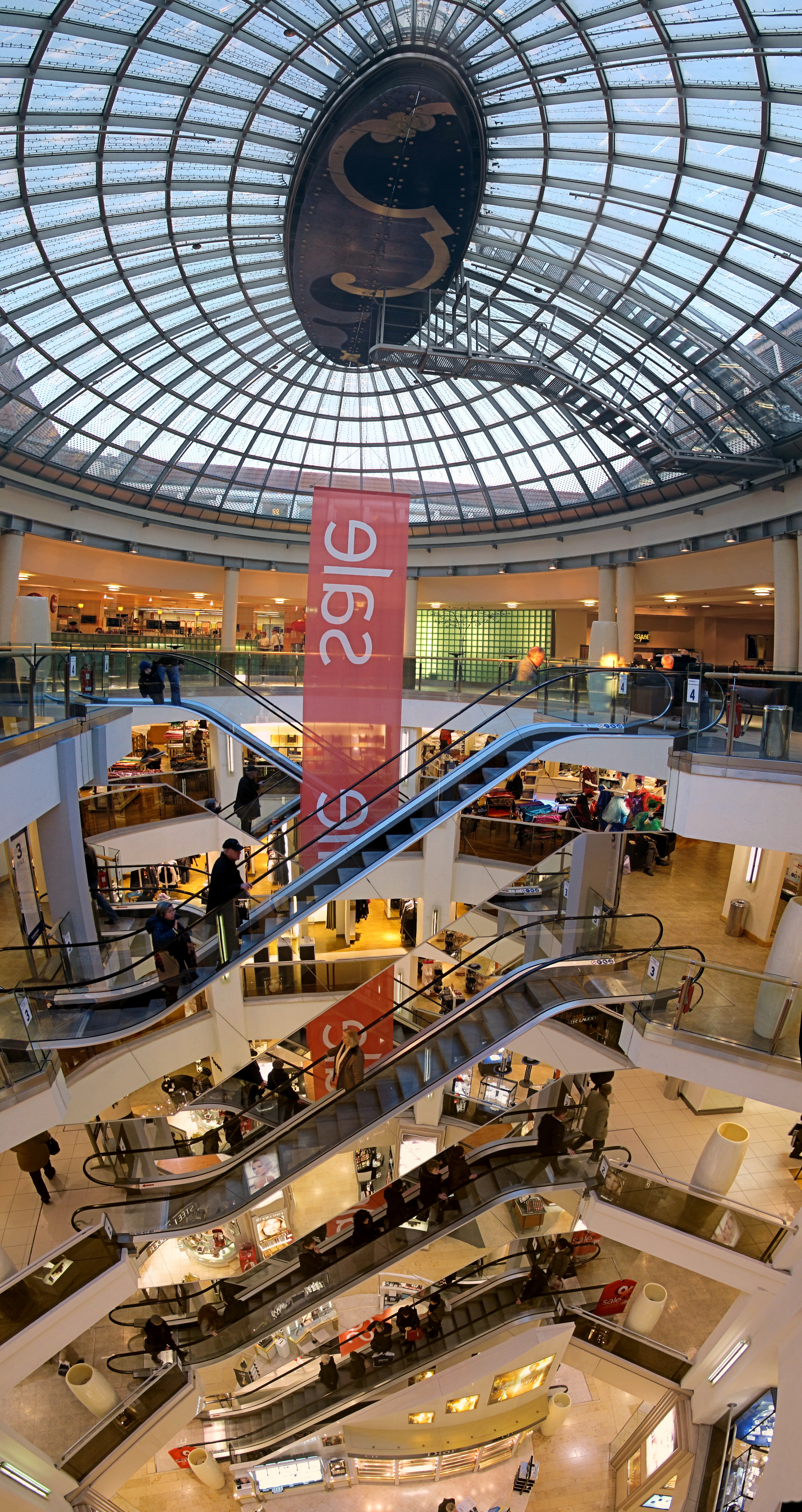
Atrium

The Karstadt München Bahnhofplatz is a department store of the Karstadt Warenhaus GmbH located in Maxvorstadt, Munich. The store closed on June 30, 2023.

== History ==
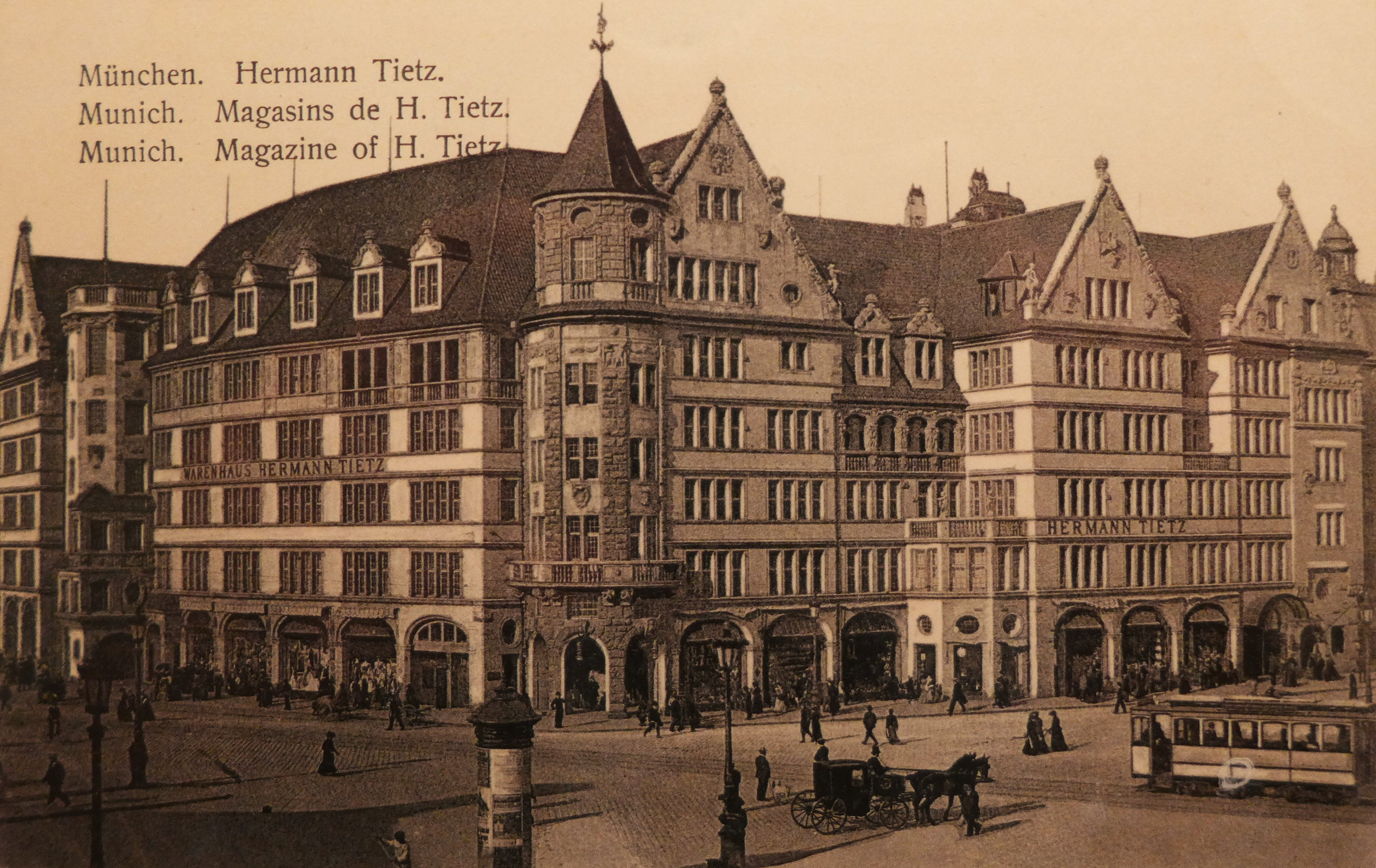
Historical view of the department store that was designed by Max Littmann and Hermann Tietz at the Munich Bahnhofvorplatz 7, postcard from 1909

The traditional, historically protected department store was built between 1904 and 1905 according to designs by the Munich architect Max Littmann for the department store chain Hermann Tietz, opposite the Hauptbahnhof, and opened on 14 March 1905. In the design of the building, Littmann used elements of the German Renaissance, following the historicizing taste of the time. The former department store Tietz is a five-storey hipped roof construction with protrusions, stair towers, gables and dormers. It was built in a skeletal steel construction with reduced historicizing façade structures, partly with muschelkalk. The sculptural façade decoration is by Julius Seidler, Jakob Bradl and Fidel Enderle.

Already around 1930 the two opposing escalators in the large Lichthof were worked to reflect the city's flair. After damage to the façades as a result of World War II, the building was rebuilt in a simplified manner and then substantially extended. The vast expansion from the year 1971 comes from the renowned architect Fred Angerer. With almost 40,000 square meters of sales space, a 220-meter-long façade along Schützenstraße and an underground car park for 500 cars, the building complex is one of the largest department stores in Germany.

The building belonged to Hertie and was remained as such after the takeover of the company, especially since the Karstadt-Haus Oberpollinger is nearby. After the newly founded company Hertie GmbH (formerly Karstadt Kompakt) revived the name "Hertie" on 1 March 2007, the house belonging to Karstadt Warenhaus GmbH had to be renamed "Karstadt München Bahnhofplatz". The renaming took place step by step until the complete change of name took place on 27 September, 2007. The six-storey building is one of the most coveted large-scale properties in Munich's city center. In 2015, the German-Irish investment company Signature Capital acquired the property in a bidding contest. After a year and a half, it was sold in August 2016 to the real estate company RFR Holding, led by the two German-born property investors Aby Rosen and Michael Fuchs. The market value rose by almost 40 percent. At the beginning of October 2016 it became known that the real estate Signa Holding, founded by René Benko, took part in the extensive department store complex through a 50:50 joint venture.

The store closed on June 30, 2023.
