= Bennosäule =

Cultural heritage monument in Bavaria, Germany

Coordinates: 48°09′06″N 11°33′09″E

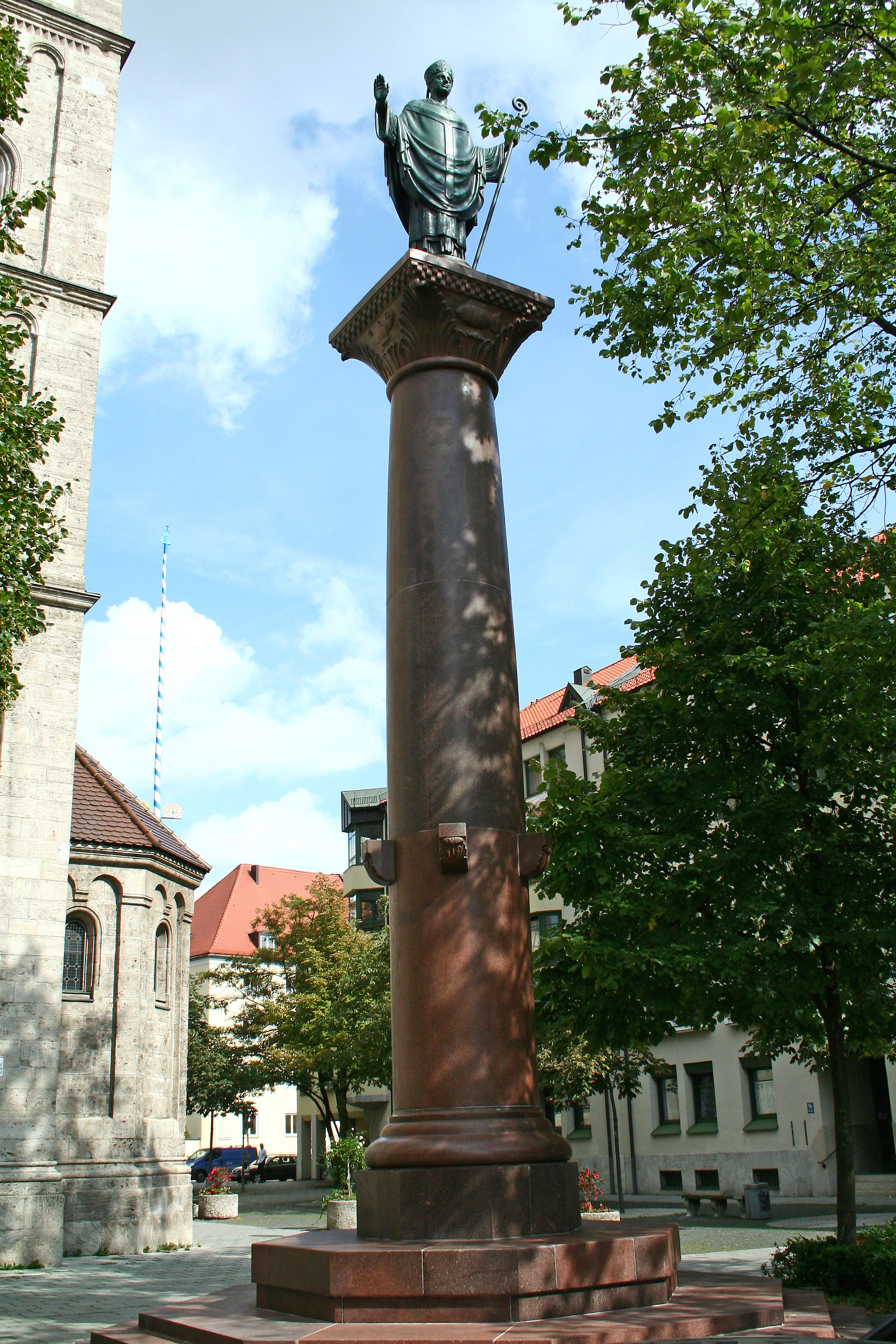
The Bennosäule.

Bennosäule is a stone pillar and bronze statue located in Maxvorstadt, Munich, Bavaria, Germany. It was created by German Bestelmeyer and George Albert Hofer, cast by Ferdinand von Miller, and erected in 1910.

The base is 11.60 meters (38.1 ft) high and is made of red porphyry. On the base is a 3-meter (9.8 ft) high bronze figure of Benno of Meissen in full episcopal regalia.
