= Geologisches Museum München =

German museum

Coordinates: 48°08′50″N 11°33′53″E

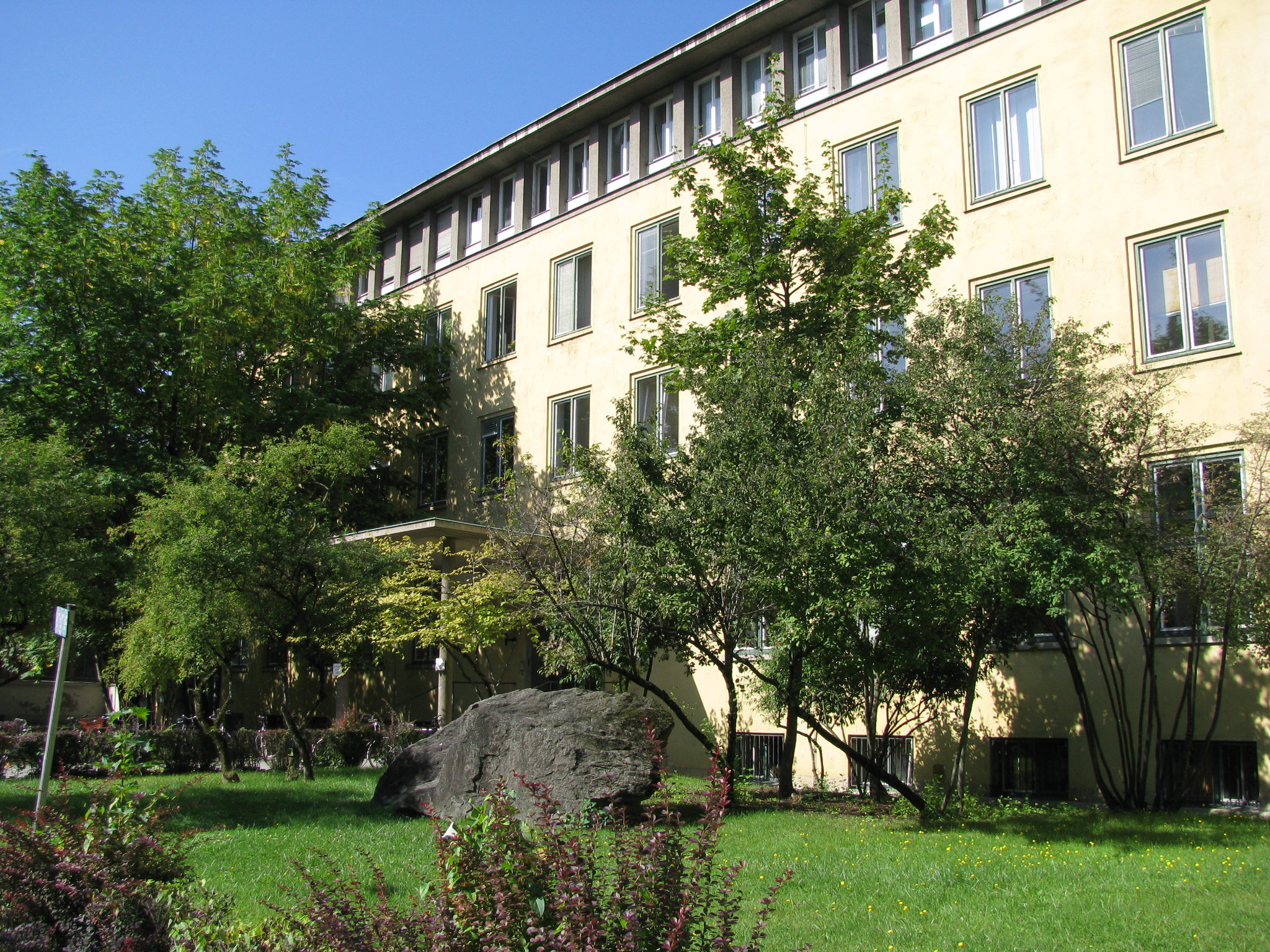
The building at Luisenstrasse 37 of the LMU Munich (Institute for General and Applied Geology) houses the Geological Museum Munich

The Geologisches Museum München (Geological Museum, Munich) is located at Luisenstrasse 37, 80333 in Maxvorstadt, Munich. Together with the adjacent Palaeontological Museum, the geological museum is part of the Bayerische Staatssammlung für Paläontologie und Geologie (Bavarian State Collection for Palaeontology and Geology, BSPG), within the Staatliche Naturwissenschaftliche Sammlungen Bayerns (Bavarian State Collections of Natural History, SNSB).

== History ==
The collections date back to the 19th century geological collection of the Bavarian Academy of Sciences, but much of the historical collection was destroyed in 1944 during World War II, although some important specimens were preserved through evacuation. The current museum has been open to the public since 1975. The museum has approximately 450 m^{2} of exhibition space.

Until 1920, geology and paleontology at Ludwig-Maximilians University (LMU) were united within a single institute. They shared space with the State Collection of Geology and Paleontology (BPSG), which operated independently and had its own funding. The current museum is co-located with the faculty of geosciences of LMU.
