= Städtisches Luisengymnasium München =

Secondary school in Munich, Germany

Coordinates: 48°08′34″N 11°33′42″E

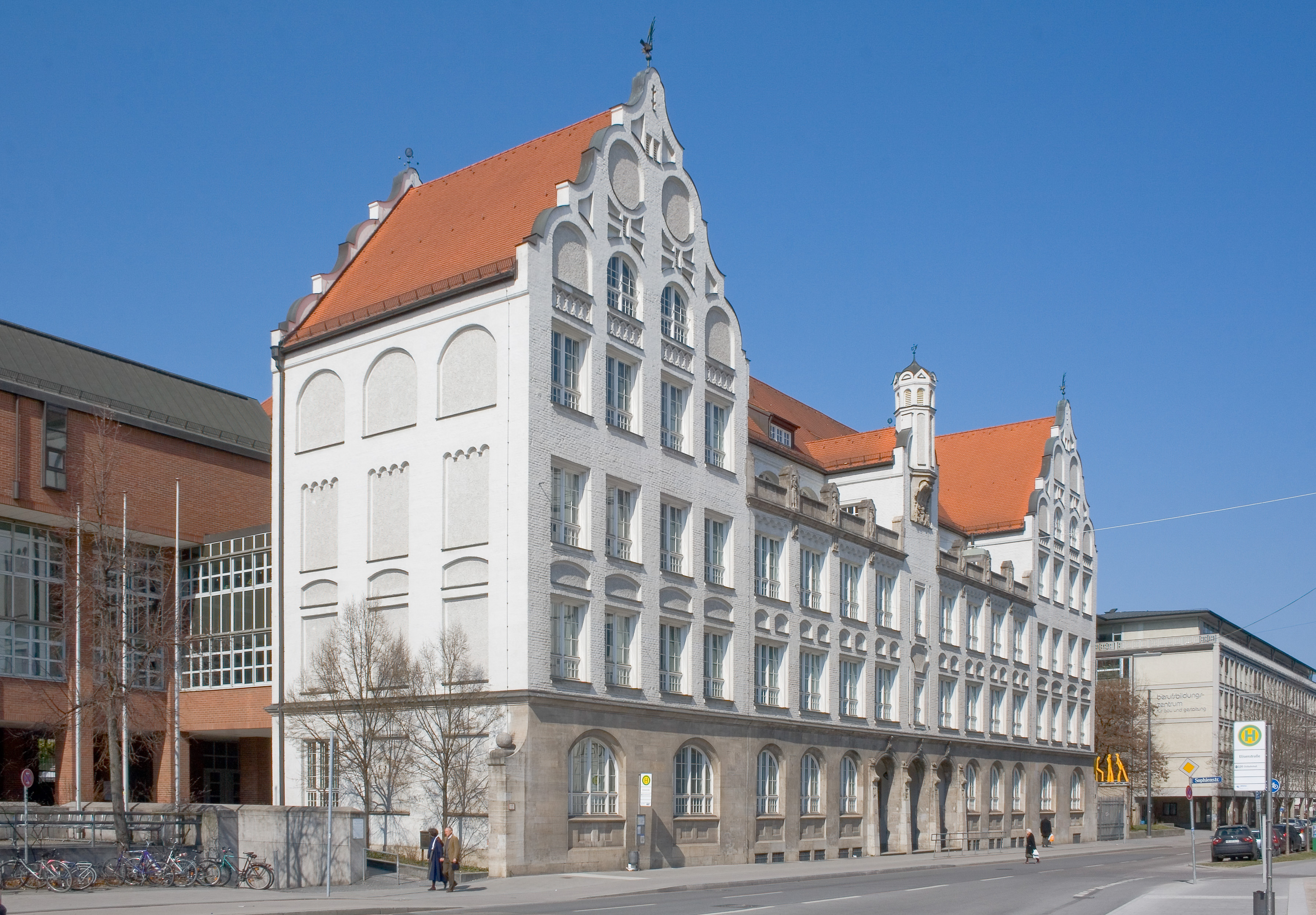
Exterior view

Städtisches Luisengymnasium München is a secondary school located in Maxvorstadt, Munich, Bavaria, Germany.

== Location ==
The Luisengymnasium is located in the Maxvorstadt district of Munich near the main train station at Luisenstraße 7. The school is centrally located on the Old Botanical Garden in the immediate vicinity of Stachus and Königsplatz.

== History ==
Founded in 1822 as the "School for Higher Daughters" and co-educational since 1969, it is Munich's oldest municipal high school and one of the few schools with its own school constitution. The Luisengymnasium is named after Princess Ludovika Wilhelmine of Bavaria, who later became Duchess Luise. She was the daughter of Maximilian I. Joseph (Bavaria) and mother of the legendary Sisi. She was very influential and enjoyed tremendous prestige. In 1812, Gartenstrasse, which was then on the outskirts of the city, was renamed Luisenstrasse in her honor. The school was founded by Simon Spitzweg, the father of the famous painter Carl Spitzweg.

In 1901 the students moved into the school house planned by Theodor Fischer. Peace activist Marie Zehetmaier was one of the first women to get a job as a physics and math teacher. From 1905 she taught at the Luisengymnasium.

When the "School for Higher Daughters" moved to the newly built Theodor Fischer Building in 1901, the Munich school called it the Luis School. In 1961, the already common name was also given a formal name, and from then on the school could call itself the Municipal Luisengymnasium.

After the destruction of the Second World War made a four-year evacuation necessary, the students moved back to the renovated building in 1949. In 1952 the Maria Heldrich Landheim was established in Pöcking on Lake Starnberg . In 1969 co-education was introduced. In 1987, after three years of construction, the clinker brick construction was completed and the general renovation of the old building started. In 1990 the relocation to the newly designed old building began. The Luisengymnasium has been an all-day high school since 2005. The new cafeteria was inaugurated on April 21, 2009.

The Luisengymnasium, like all of Bavaria's grammar schools, has switched from the G9 to the G8 . Since the 2010/11 school year there has been a musical branch in addition to the modern language.

The school is a member of the School without Racism - School with Courage network .
