= Schauspiel München =

Acting school in Maxvorstadt, Munich, Bavaria, Germany

Coordinates: 48°08′42″N 11°33′39″E

Schauspiel München is located in Maxvorstadt, Munich, Bavaria, Germany.
