= Schellingstraße =

Street in Munich, Germany

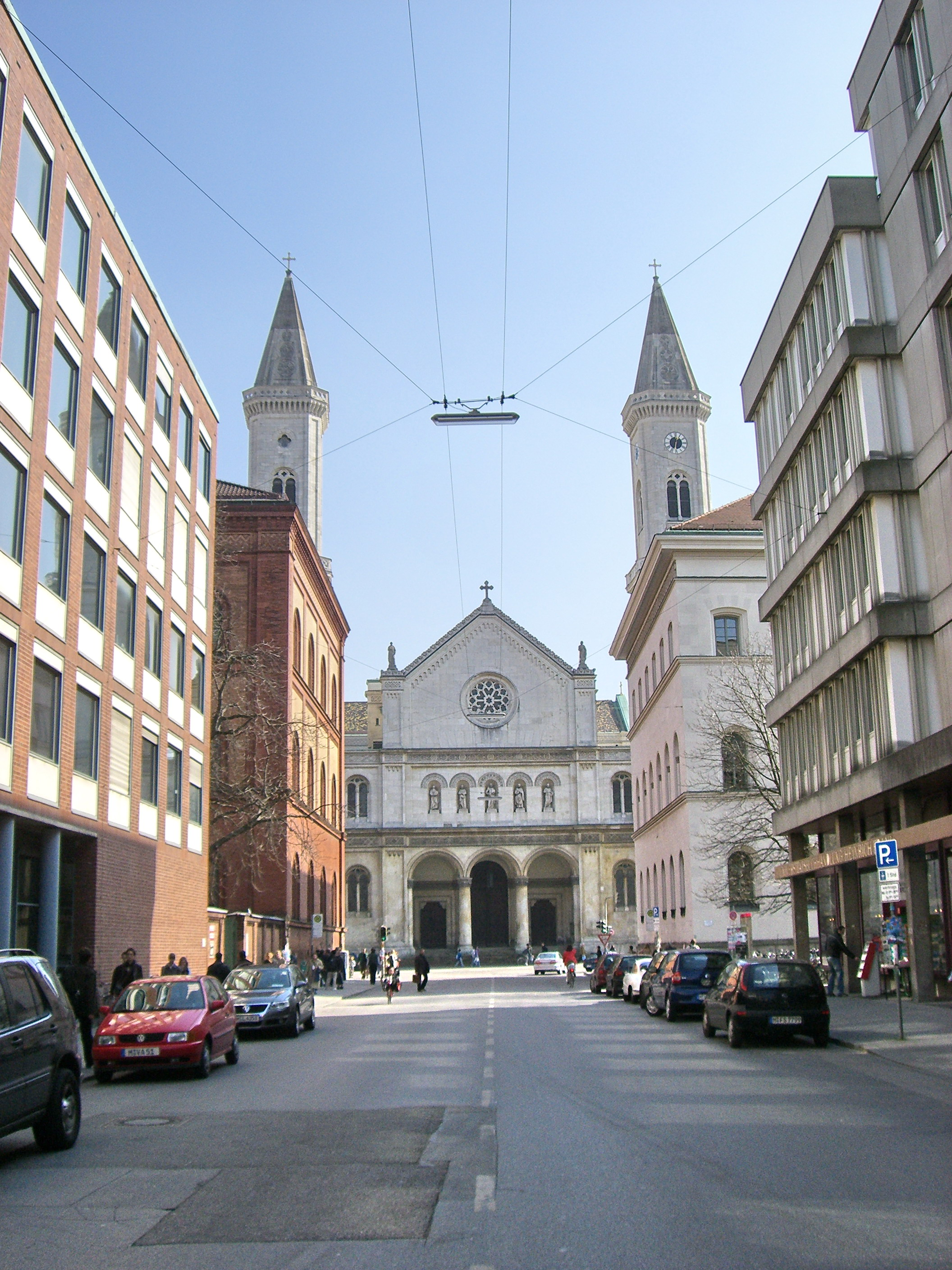
View from the Schellingstraße to St. Ludwig church

The Schellingstraße is a 1.9 km long street in the Maxvorstadt in Munich.

== History ==
The traditional restaurants in the streets were visited by Bertolt Brecht, Wassily Kandinsky, Rainer Maria Rilke, Lenin, Franz Josef Strauß (Schelling-Salon) and Thomas Mann, Frank Wedekind, Joachim Ringelnatz, Stefan George, Franz Marc, Paul Klee, Vladimir Lenin (Café Altschwabing).
