= Stimmkreis München-Schwabing =

Stimmkreis München-Schwabing is an electoral district for the Landtag of Bavaria located in Schwabing and Maxvorstadt, Munich, Bavaria, Germany.
