= TheaterRaum München =

Acting school in Munich, Bavaria, Germany

TheaterRaum München is located in Maxvorstadt, Munich, Bavaria, Germany.

TheaterRaum München (TRM) is a private state-recognized vocational school for acting and directing headed by Heiko Dietz. It is located on Kurfürstenstrasse in the Maxvorstadt district of Munich.

The average duration of training is three years; the training is project-related and therefore relatively unconventional. The schooling is based on the principles of David Mamet. Traditional methods of theater theory are dispensed with, rather the training concentrates on the individual person, who is to be developed through practical experience on stage. TheaterRaum München works closely with the Munich Theater.
