= Karl von Fischer =

German architect

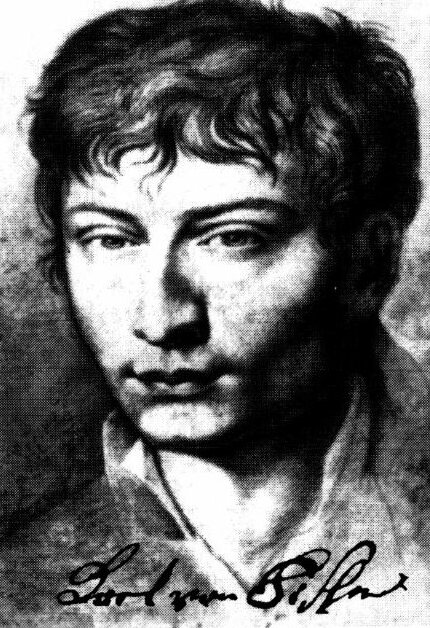
- Karl von Fischer
- Born: 19 September 1782; Mannheim
- Died: 11 February 1820 (aged 27); Munich
- Burial place: Alter Südfriedhof
- Occupation: architect
- Known for: neo-classicism in South Germany, professor of architecture at the Academy of Fine Arts, Munich
- Notable work: Prinz-Carl-Palais and National Theatre (Munich)

Karl (Carl) von Fischer (19 September 1782 – 12 February 1820) was a German architect. His plans had considerable influence on the architecture of neo-classicism in Munich and South Germany.

== Biography ==
Fischer was born in Mannheim. From 1796 Fischer was trained by Maximilian von Verschaffelt before he moved to Vienna in 1799 to study architecture under Ferdinand von Hohenberg.

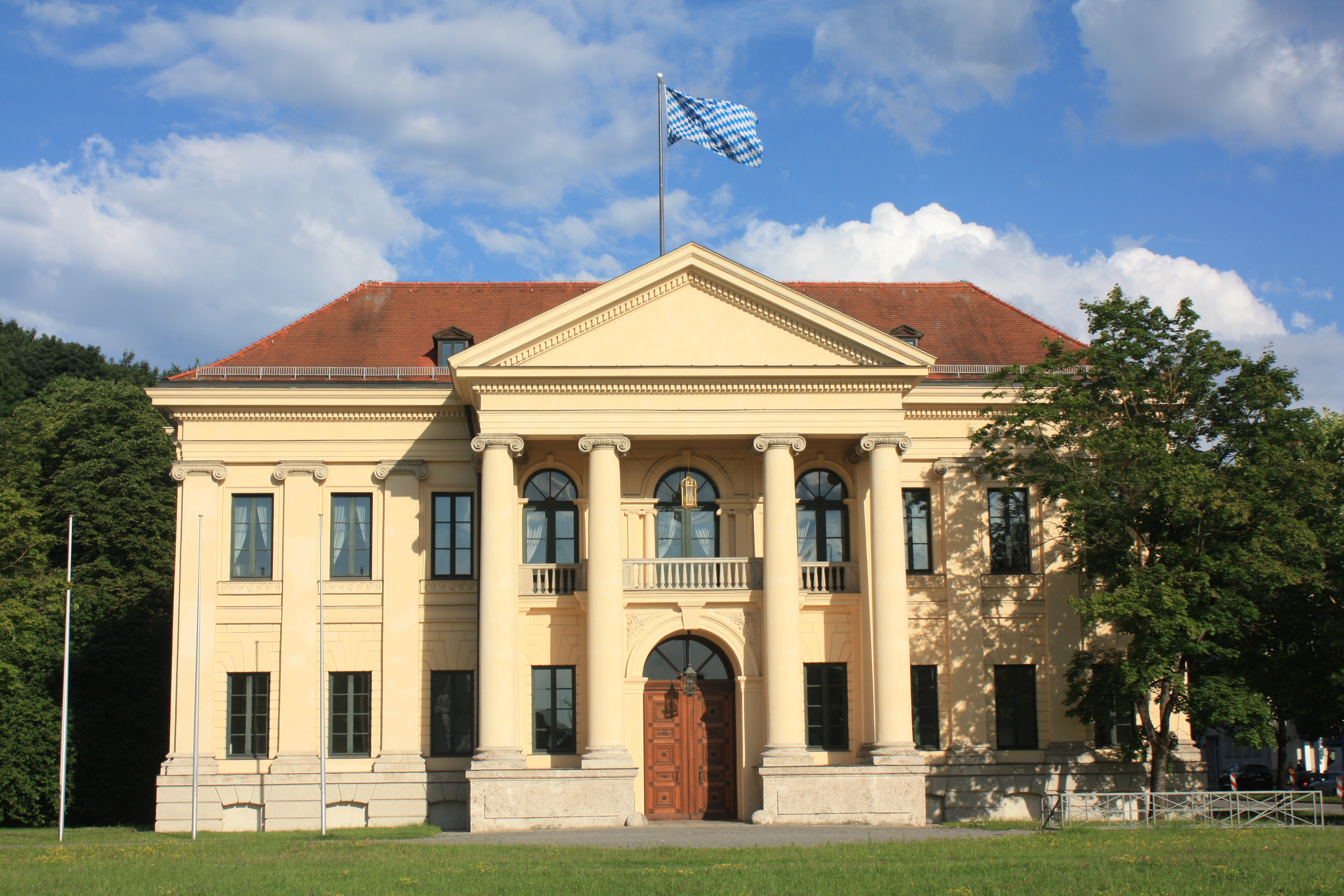
Prinz-Carl-Palais in Munich

An early design, at the age of only 22, the Prinz-Carl-Palais in Munich (completed 1803), made him famous and he became a professor of architecture at the Academy of Fine Arts, Munich in 1809. In 1811–18 Fischer constructed the National Theatre, destroyed in an 1823 fire. He also created the plan for the extension of Munich, especially for the Brienner Strasse with the circular Karolinenplatz and the Königsplatz, the last of which was built to Klenze's plan.

Fischer, who was a representative of pure classicism and who rejected romantic historism, was soon displaced by Leo von Klenze as chief architect for the Bavarian court. He died in Munich aged 38, and is buried in the Alter Südfriedhof.

His notable pupils include Friedrich von Gärtner.

== See also ==
- Neoclassical architecture
- Greek Revival
