= Schelling =

Schelling is a surname. Notable persons with that name include:

- Friedrich Wilhelm Joseph Schelling (1775–1854), German philosopher
- Caroline Schelling (1763–1809), German intellectual and wife of Friedrich Wilhelm Joseph Schelling
- Felix Emanuel Schelling (1858–1945), American educator
- Ernest Schelling (1876–1939), American composer
- Erich Schelling (1904–1986), German architect
- Thomas Schelling (1921–2016), American economist
- Andrew Schelling (born 1953), American poet and translator
- Hans Jörg Schelling (born 1953) Austrian entrepreneur
- Hans Schelling (1954–2008), Dutch sailor
- Florence Schelling (born 1989), Swiss ice hockey goaltender
- Patrick Schelling (born 1990), Swiss cyclist

== Other uses ==
- Schelling, Dutch name for the shilling
- Schelling, old name of the Dutch island of Terschelling
- Schelling-Salon, building in Bavaria
