= Wohnheimsiedlung Maßmannplatz =

Cultural heritage monument in Bavaria, Germany

Coordinates: 48°09′12″N 11°33′33″E

Wohnheimsiedlung Maßmannplatz is located in Maxvorstadt, Munich, Bavaria, Germany.
