= Wohnhaus Reinemann =

Demolished building in Maxvorstadt, Munich

Coordinates: 48°08′37″N 11°33′56″E

Wohnhaus Reinemann is located in Maxvorstadt, Munich, Bavaria, Germany.
