= St. Joseph (Munich) =

Catholic church in Munich, Germany

Coordinates: 48°09′19″N 11°34′04″E

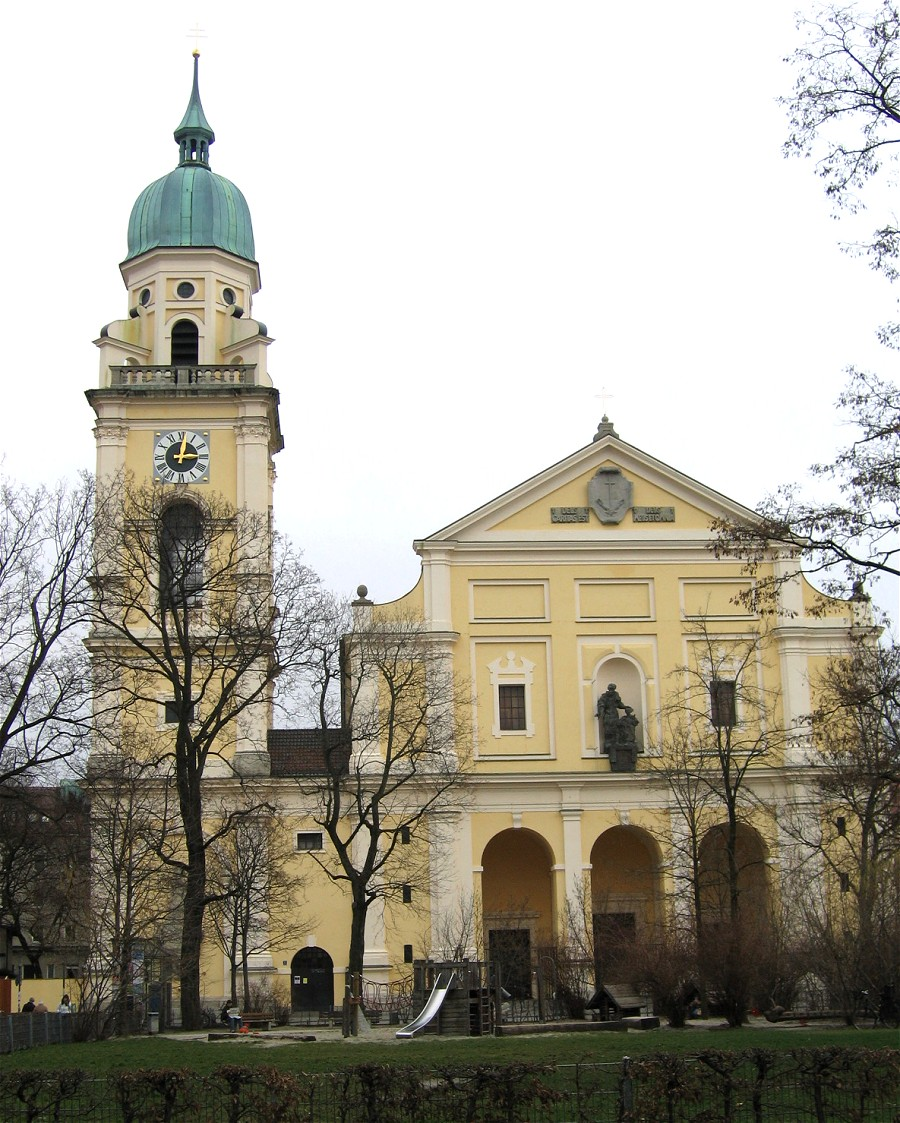
St. Joseph church, Munich

St. Joseph is a Roman Catholic church located in Maxvorstadt, Munich, Bavaria, Germany.
