= 8. November 1939 (memorial) =

Monument in Munich, Germany

Coordinates: 48°09′03″N 11°34′36″E

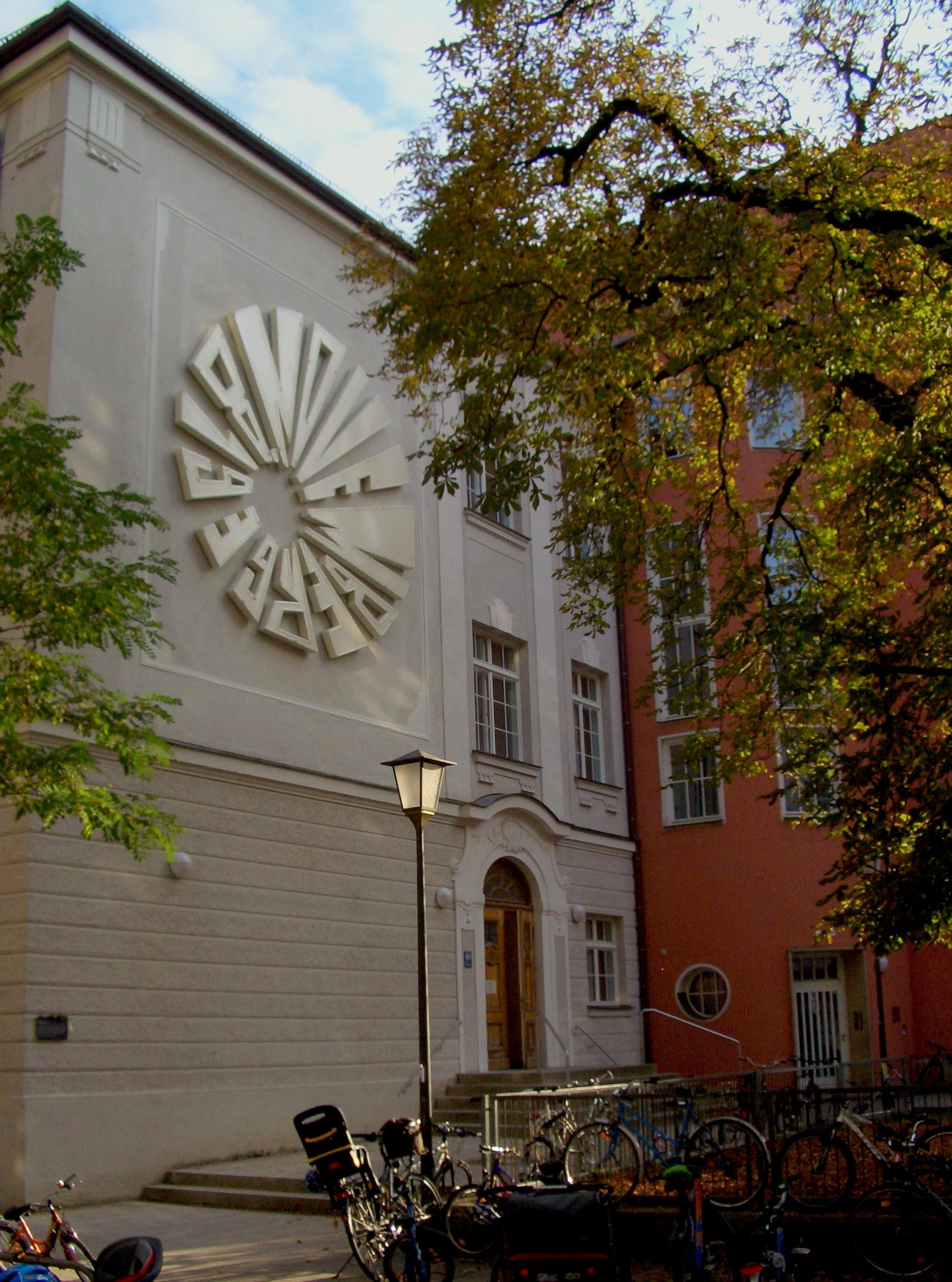
Monument as it appears in the day (unlit)

8. November 1939 is the name of the Johann Georg Elser Memorial in Munich to commemorate the resistance fighters fighting against the Nazis. The monument is located in the Maxvorstadt district.

== History ==
On 8 November 1939, the carpenter Johann Georg Elser perpetrated in Munich's Bürgerbräukeller with a time bomb with the intention to assassinate Adolf Hitler. The attack failed; Elser was arrested and shortly before the end of the Second World War, was killed in the Dachau concentration camp.

== Site and monument ==
To prepare for the assassination Elser moved to Munich in the summer of 1939. The monument is located close to the former site of the room he had rented.

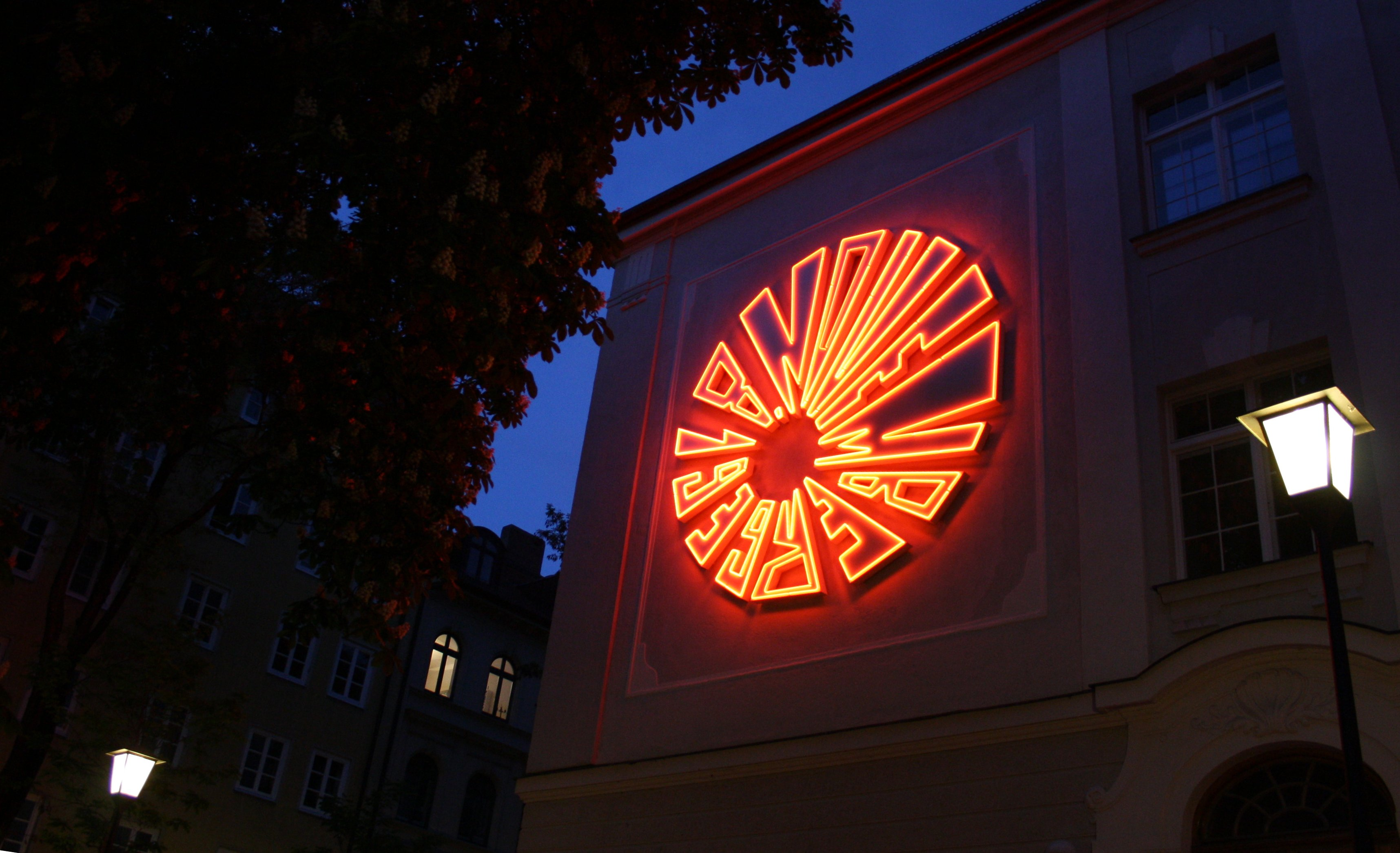
Monument lit at 21:20

The monument was designed by artist Silke Wagner. The monument is made of aluminium and glass forming the lettering "8 November 1939". The elements are arranged in a circle in a way that represents an explosion. Every night at 21:20 (the exact time of the detonation of the bomb) the numbers are illuminated one by one until the entire script is glowing. The lights remain on for a minute before turning off again.
