= Altstadtringtunnel =

Road tunnel in Munich, Germany

Coordinates: 48°08′41″N 11°34′54″E

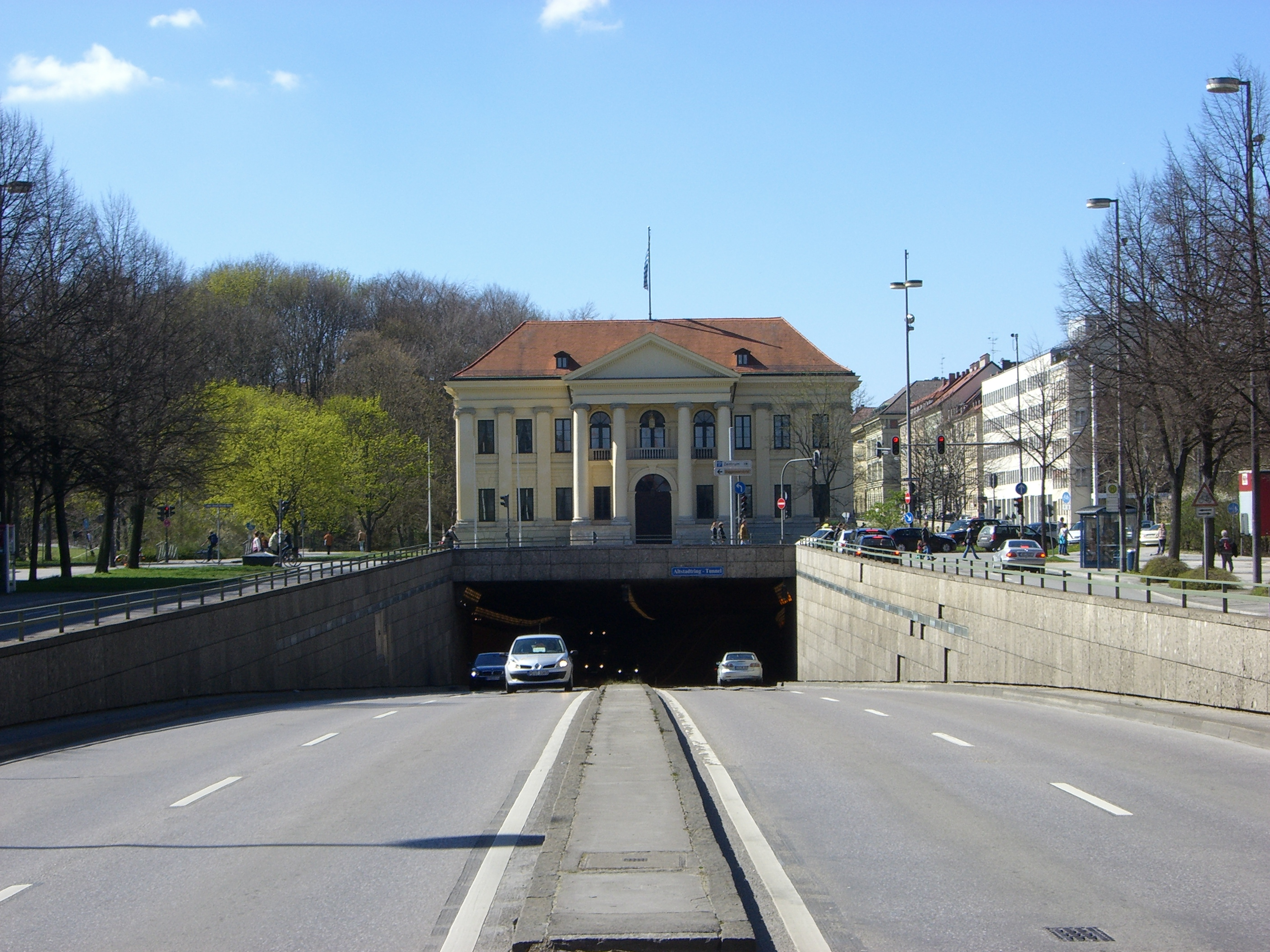
München - Altstadtring 01 (Altstadtringtunnel in der Prinzregentenstr.).jpg

Altstadtringtunnel (Altstadtring tunnel) is a tunnel located in Maxvorstadt, Munich, Bavaria, Germany.

It underwent renovation that completed in the middle of 2023.

== See also ==
- Altstadtring
