= St.-Benno-Viertel =

Coordinates: 48°09′02″N 11°33′13″E

St.-Benno-Viertel is located in Maxvorstadt, Munich, Bavaria, Germany.
