= Memorial for Franz Xaver Gabelsberger =

Monument in Munich, Germany

Coordinates: 48°08′30″N 11°34′04″E

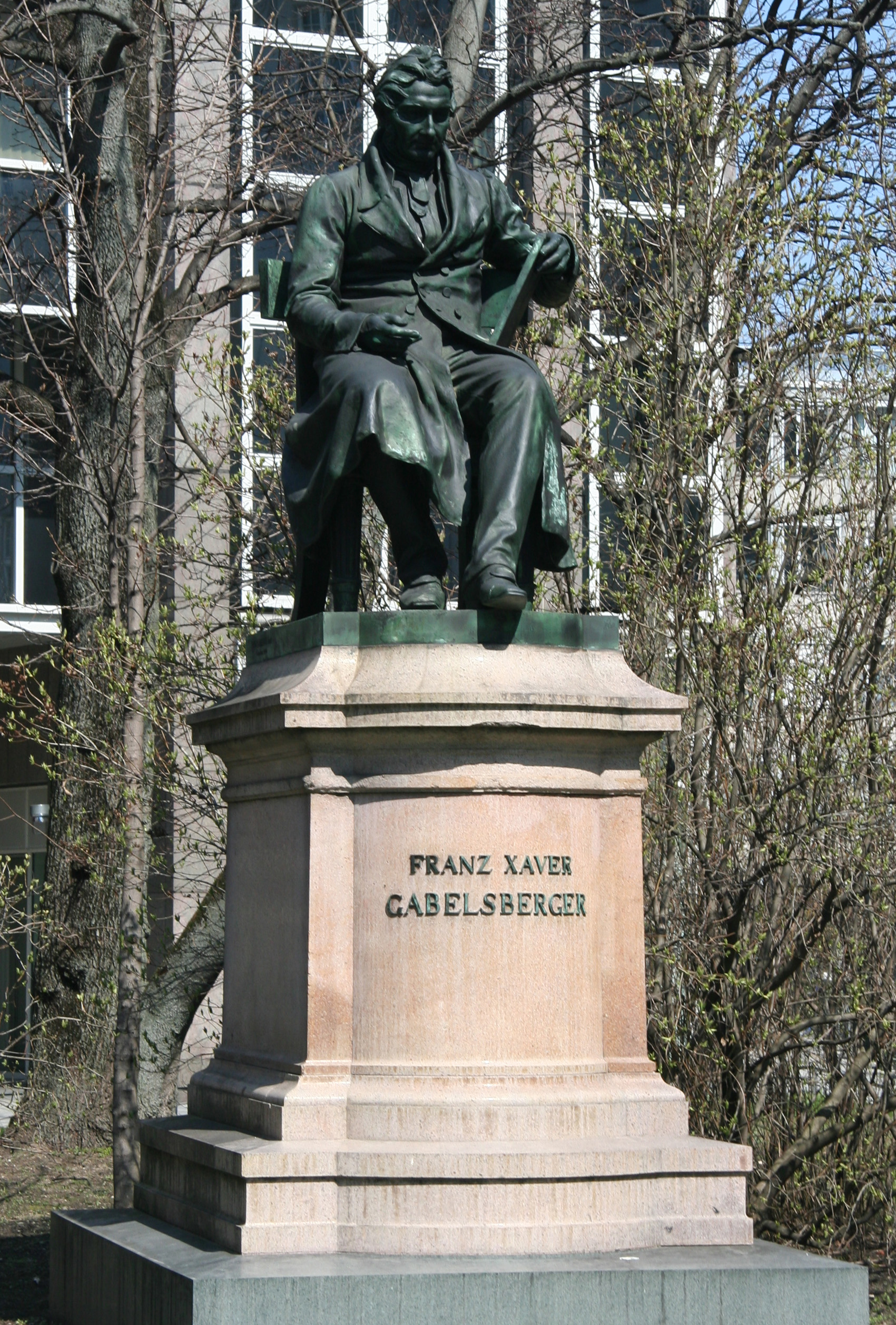
The Gabelsberger memorial by Syrius Eberle

Memorial for Franz Xaver Gabelsberger is a monument located in Maxvorstadt, Munich, Bavaria, Germany. The monument is a bronze sculpture by the German sculptor Syrius Eberle. It was dedicated shortly after the hundredth anniversary of the birth of Franz Xaver Gabelsberger (1789-1849), the inventor of a cursive shorthand system. Casting was by Ferdinand von Miller.

The monument shows Gabelsberger in a sitting position and is mounted on a stone base. The location is a plaza at the confluence of Barer Strasse in Ottostraße in the district of Maxvorstadt.

Due some problems Syrius Eberle could not complete the monument on time. Thus the 100th anniversary celebration occurred a year later at the 40th Foundation celebration of stenographers central association. The inauguration of the monument was in August 1890.

The monument is registered as a historic landmark in the Bavarian monument list.
