= Salzstadelkaserne =

Former military barracks in Munich, Germany

Coordinates: 48°08′31″N 11°33′26″E

Salzstadelkaserne, or Salzstadel Barracks, is a former military barracks located in Maxvorstadt, Munich, Bavaria, Germany. Also known as the Jägerkaserne ("Jäger barracks"), it was used by infantry units between 1860 and 1890.
