= St. Markus (Munich) =

Church in Munich, Germany

Coordinates: 48°08′46″N 11°34′28″E

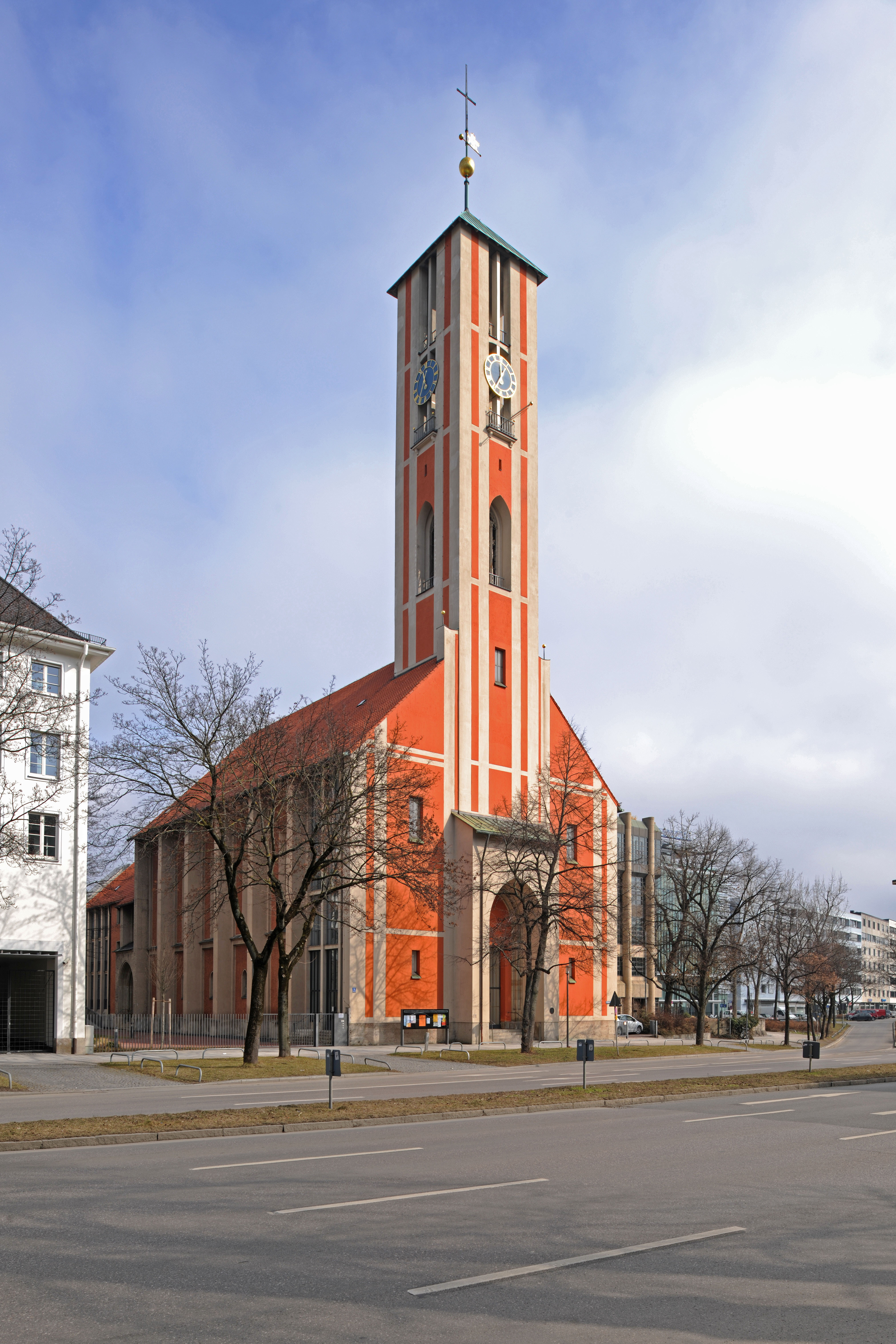
St. Markus in 2012

St. Markus (German: Markuskirche) is a Lutheran church located in Maxvorstadt, Munich, Bavaria, Germany. The original church building was constructed in the 1870s and designed by architect Rudolf Gottlieb. The original building was damaged during the Second World War. The modern-day building was constructed in 1957 and designed by Gustav Gsaenger incorporating surviving wall structures.
