= Dichtergarten (Munich) =

Garden

Coordinates: 48°08′38″N 11°34′54″E

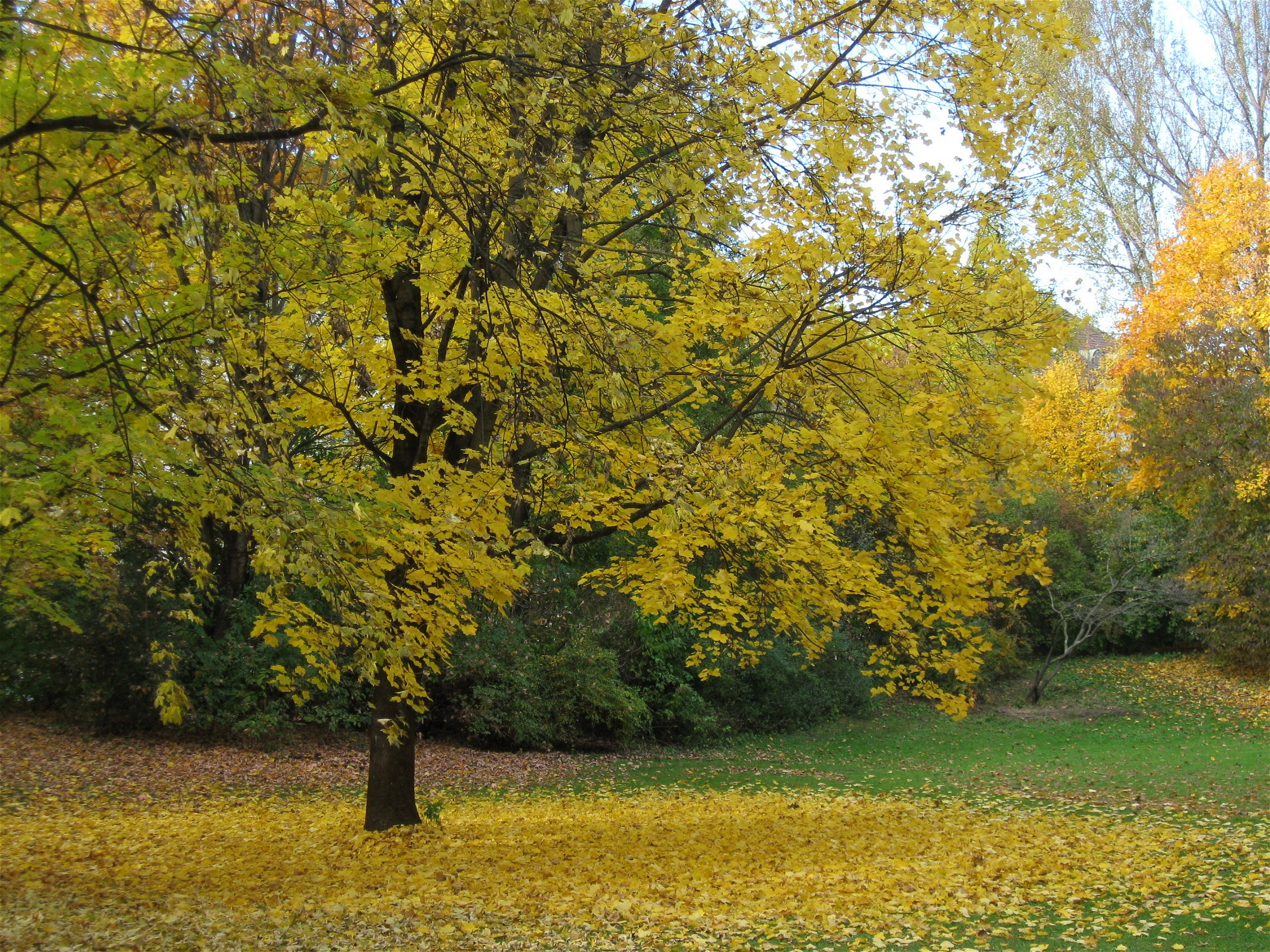

Dichtergarten is a garden located in Maxvorstadt, Munich, Bavaria, Germany.
