= SportA =

German sports rights agency

Coordinates: 48°08′52″N 11°33′25″E

SportA is the sports rights agency of Germany's two main public TV stations, ARD and ZDF. It is located in Maxvorstadt, Munich, Bavaria, Germany.
