= Richard-Wagner-Straße (Munich) =

Street in Maxvorstadt, Munich, Germany

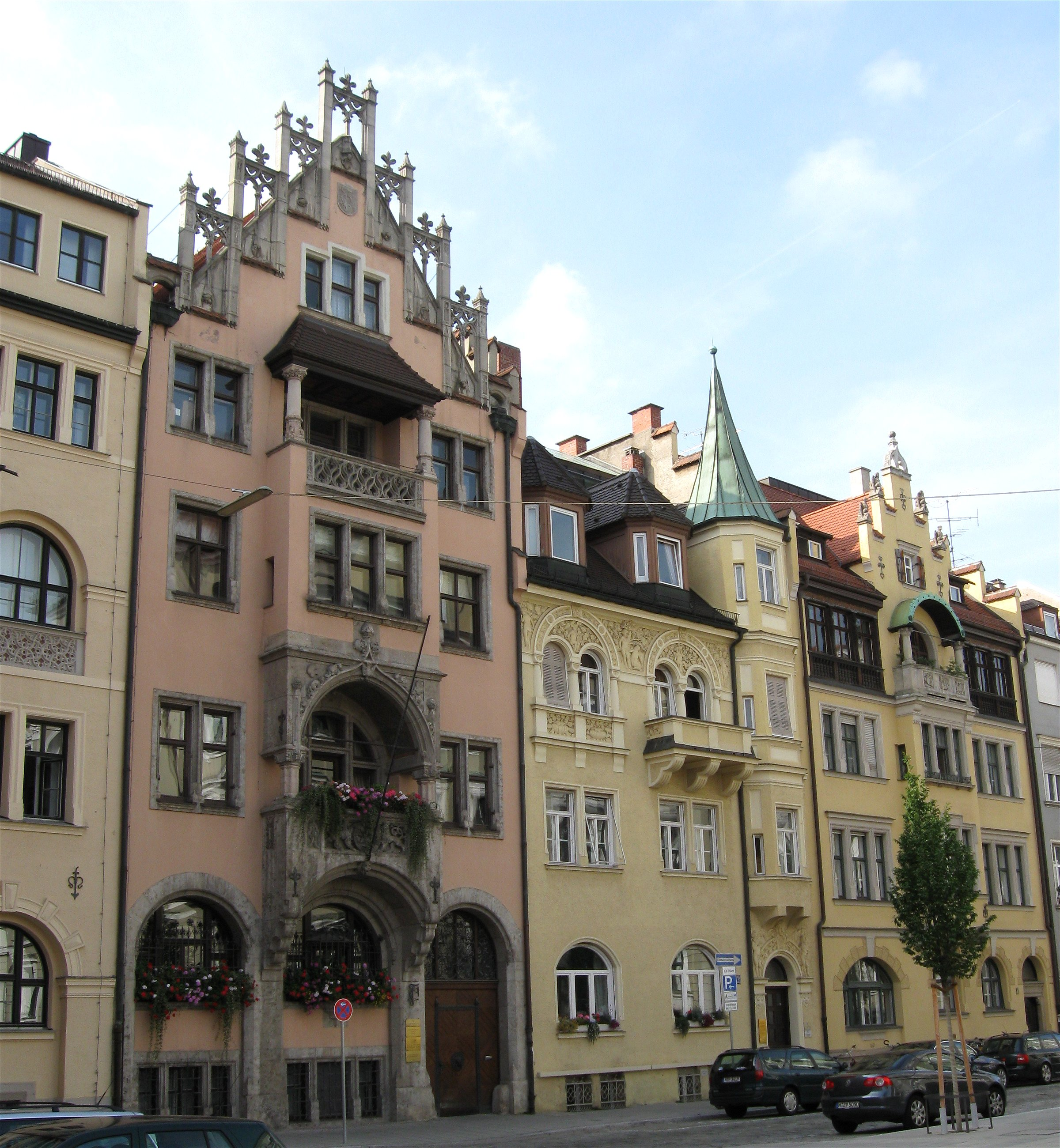
Richard-Wagner-Straße No. 5-11

The Richard-Wagner-Straße is a street in the Bavarian state capital Munich, Germany. It is named after the composer Richard Wagner (1813-1883), who lived in the vicinity of Brienner Straße 37 in 1864-65.

== Location ==
The short street was built in 1897 in the course of the planned development of Maxvorstadt and forms part of the large right-angled street system of this district. It leads from Brienner Straße in the north-east direction to Gabelsbergerstraße. At about the half way point, it curves.

== History ==
The houses of the street were built between 1899 and 1906 mostly designed by the architect Leonhard Romeis (1854-1904). In his design, he cited various architectural periods, keeping in mind the taste of late historicism, to give the impression of a grown street. The rich structure of the houses, which is still largely preserved today, creates a particularly picturesque, self-contained area, which stands under monument protection as an ensemble. The eleven preserved historic buildings of this street are also listed as individual monuments under monument protection. More recently are the main administration of the E.ON energy group as well as an urban nursery (No. 14) and a student residence (No. 16).

The proximity to the Königsplatz made the street an address for the upscale bourgeoisie. Joseph Schülein (1854-1938), lived there until his move to Schloss Kaltenberg (No. 7). His son-in-law, the Jewish surgeon Alfred Haas, operated a private clinic (No. 17 and 19). The publisher Fritz Gerlich (1883-1934) lived until his imprisonment and assassination, in house No. 21.

During the period of National Socialism, the Nazi horse racing organization Kuratorium für das Braune Band von Deutschland located in house No. 7. In House No. 11 a so-called Judenhaus was established.

Several institutions have or have had their seat in the street, such as the former Royal College of Art, today the Palaeontological State Collection with the Palaeontological Museum (No. 10), and the Isar Amperwerke, today E.ON.

== Buildings ==
No.	function	built	description	image
1				
2	Back of the Lenbachhaus			
3				
5	Apartment house	1900	five-storied neo-renaissance building with elevated protrusion tower, by Leonhard Romeis	
7	Residential house	1901-02	Four-story neo-gothic building with topped pediment, built by Leonhard Romeis	
9	Apartment house	1901-02	three-story neo-renaissance building with relief decor and polygonal tower, by Leonhard Romeis	
10	Bavarian State Collection for Paleontology Geology with the Paläontologisches Museum München	1899-1902	representative, three-story, largely free standing new barock block with courtyard, building sculpture and free standing staircase on the south side, by Leonhard Romeis; Construction-time enclosure	
11	Apartment house	1900-01	Four-story neo-renaissance building with box bay window and stepped dwarf gypsum, by Leonhard Romeis	
13	Apartment house	1905	Four-story neo-renaissance building with saddle roof, box bay window and plastic decor, by Fritz Seidlmair	
14	Municipal Children's Daycare „Friedrich Schiedel“			
15	Apartment house	1903-04	Four-story wide-mounted saddle roof construction with a dwarf gable and historical-tectonic designed plastered facade, by August Zeh, simplified after war damage, restored 1997/98 Facade reconstruction	
16	Student residence of the Van Calker Foundation		30 student apartments and 3 couples apartments	
17	Apartment house	1910-11	Four-story art nouveau style building with three-sided longitudinal balconies with elaborate metal grating, by Franz Rank	
18	Apartment house	1899-1900	Four-story, mostly freestanding corner building of historicism with tower-like corner formations, by Leonhard Romeis	
19	Residential house	1910-11	Four-story art nouveau style building with a rustic ground floor and a longitudinal balcony accessible by two bay windows, by Max Neumann, facade simplified	
27	Apartment house	about 1900	four-story historical corner building with central box bay window and lateral balconies; Commemorative plaque for Fritz Gerlich, who lived in this house	
