= Staatsarchiv München =

Bavarian state archives

Coordinates: 48°08′47″N 11°34′47″E

Staatsarchiv München is located in Maxvorstadt, Munich, Bavaria, Germany.
