= Wittelsbacher-Gymnasium München =

School in Munich, Germany

Coordinates: 48°08′45″N 11°32′55″E

The Wittelsbacher-Gymnasium München is a secondary school in Munich, the capital of Bavaria. It is located in Maxvorstadt, a central borough of the Bavarian capital.

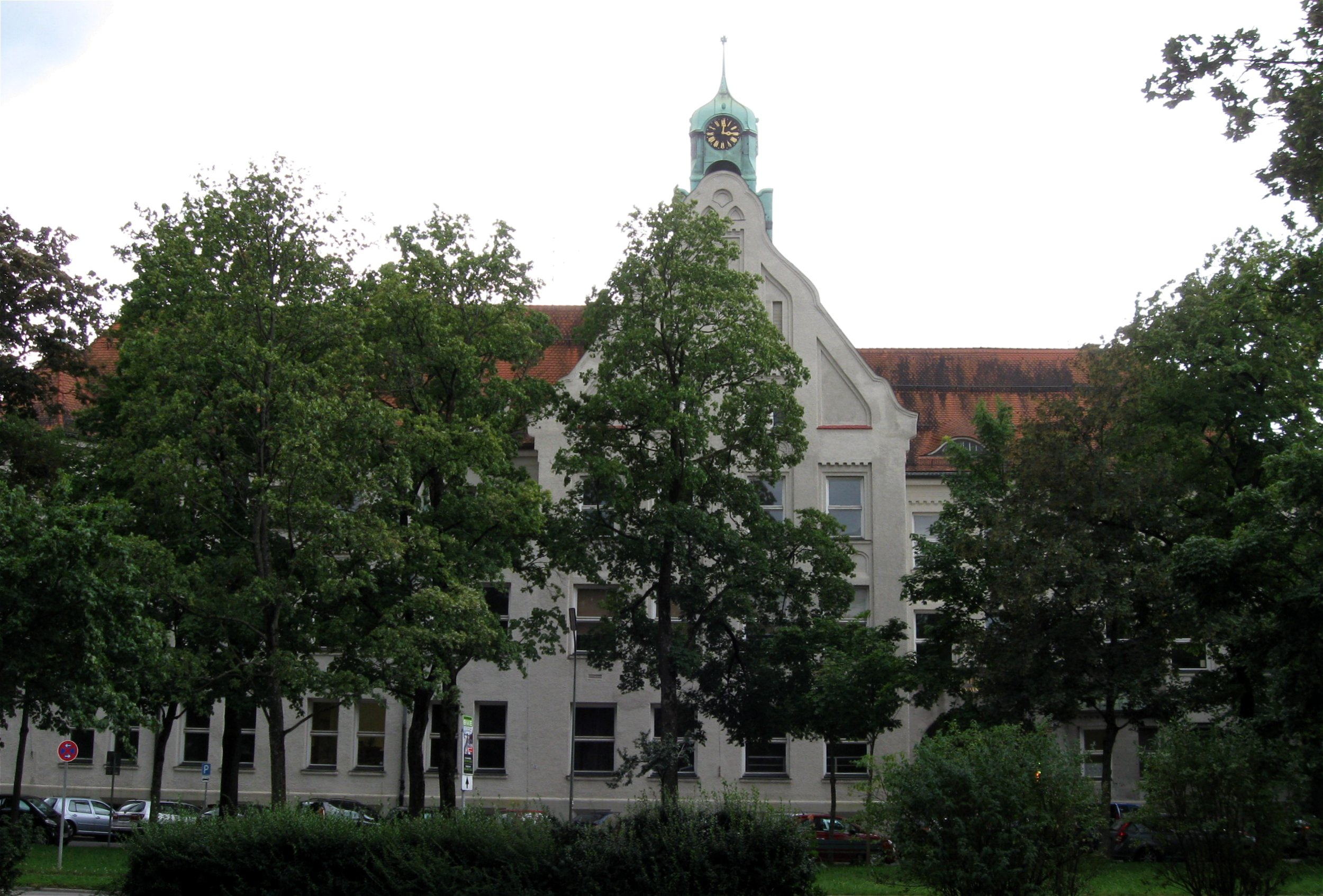
The frontal façade of the Wittelsbacher-Gymnasium in Munich.

== History ==
The gymnasium (high school) was founded in 1907. Initially, it was only open to boys but began offering co-education for boys and girls in 1974. Now, it also allows the attendance of students who define themselves as non-binary.

== Subjects ==
The gymnasium is a humanistic institution, so Latin is a compulsory subject which is taught and understood through grammatical analysis and translation.

During the ninth grade, students begin translating Caesar and Suetonius. In the course of the subsequent semesters, students translate texts written by Ovid, Cicero, Petronius, Seneca, Erasmus and Livy into the German language.

German and mathematics are compulsory subjects during the entire period of attendance.

Geography classes begin during the fifth grade and last at least until the tenth grade.

History classes commence during the sixth grade. They cover antiquity during the sixth grade and the medieval era as well as the Baroque period during the seventh grade, whereas the eighteenth century (French revolution of 1789, Enlightenment thinkers) and the nineteenth century (the political ascent of Napoleon I, outcome of the Franco-German War, Bismarck's social and cultural policies, major parties in the German Empire, industrialisation, poverty of the working classes) are discussed in the eighth grade. During the tenth grade, students learn about the assassination of Archduke Franz Ferdinand of Austria committed by Gavrilo Princip, the manifold causes of World War I, the founding of the Weimar Republic, the Nazi putsch in Munich, the ascent of Hitler, and the concentration camps created by the Nazi regime. History remains compulsory until the end of secondary education, unless it is replaced by social studies.

Religious education in Catholicism and Evangelicalism is also compulsory for students of either faith and remains compulsory until the end of their secondary education. Moreover, students may also opt to study Ethics instead.

During the tenth grade, students may choose to study history and geography in English.

Arts classes are compulsory until the tenth grade. However, they may be continued until the end of secondary education if students prefer to study arts instead of music.

Biology classes begin in the sixth grade and must be continued until the tenth grade. Prior to this, students attend classes bearing the name of Nature and Engineering.

Students may choose chemistry instead of biology during the last three years of secondary education.

In the sixth grade, students start to study the English language as a compulsory subject.

In the eighth grade, students may choose Ancient Greek or French as a third foreign language.

In the ninth grade, all students must also attend their first chemistry classes. However, they may opt to study biology instead of chemistry during their last three years of secondary education.

Therefore, one can conclude that the tenth grade demands the highest number of compulsory subjects.

During their final years of education, students must also choose a number of propaedeutic seminars in order to write their secondary school exams.
