= Altstadtring =

Street in Munich, Germany

Coordinates: 48°8′40″N 11°34′54″E

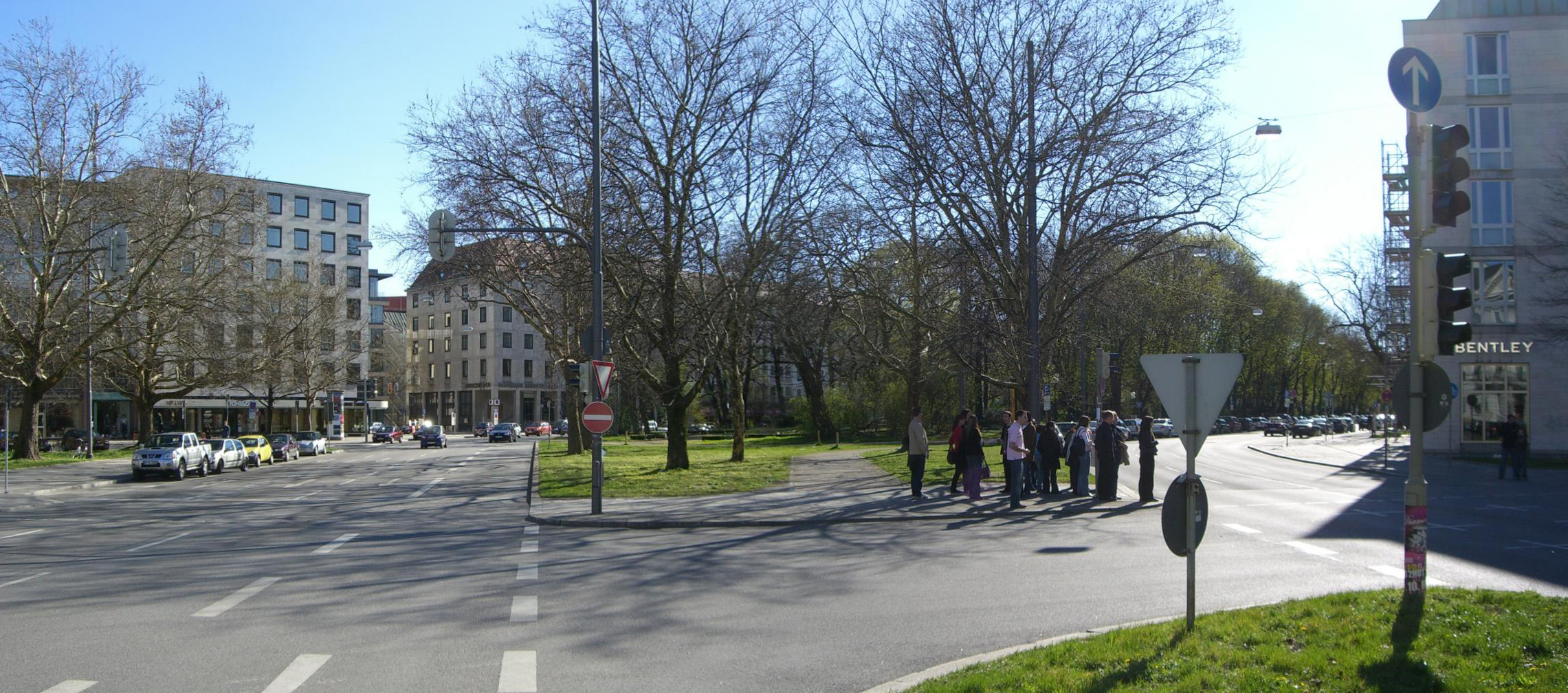
Altstadtring at Maximiliansplatz

The Altstadtring is the innermost ring road of Munich, Bavaria, Germany. With the exception of the northwestern part, it runs roughly along the path of the former second wall of Munich and surrounds Munich's Altstadt. With the exception of the part between Isartor and Sendlinger Tor, it is mostly built with four or five lanes.

Because of the loop solution, it is impossible to drive through the Altstadt by motor vehicle, and all motor traffic must use the Altstadtring.

== See also ==
- Altstadtringtunnel
