= Institut français (Munich) =

Coordinates: 48°08′50″N 11°34′59″E

Institut français is located in Maxvorstadt, Munich, Bavaria, Germany.
