= Gabriel Filmtheater =

Coordinates: 48°08′36″N 11°33′37″E

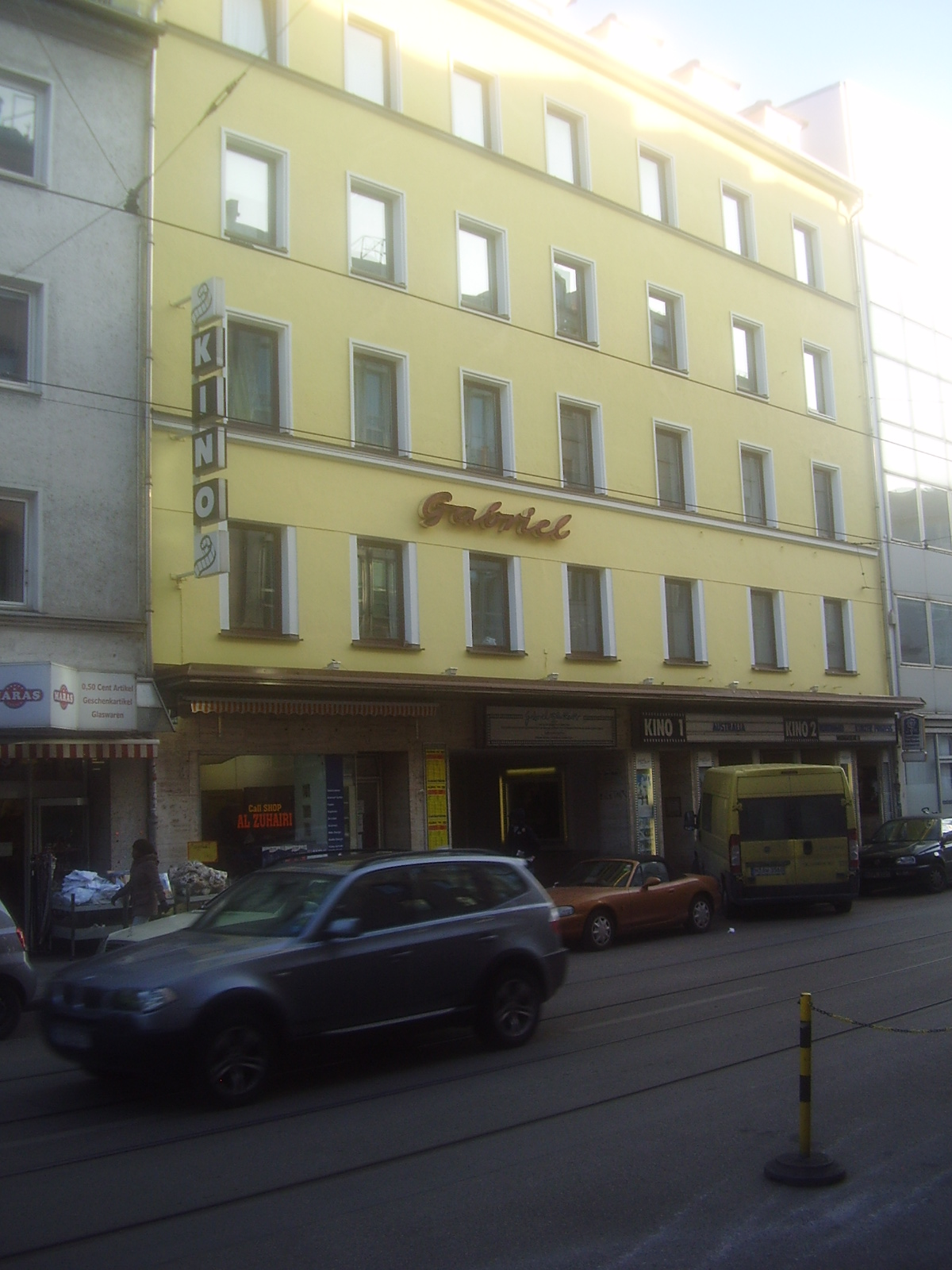
Image of Gabriel Filmtheater

Gabriel Filmtheater was located in Maxvorstadt, Munich, Bavaria, Germany. It was considered to be the world's oldest cinema still open until its closure in April 2019.
