= Architekturmuseum der Technischen Universität München =

Coordinates: 48°08′49″N 11°34′20″E

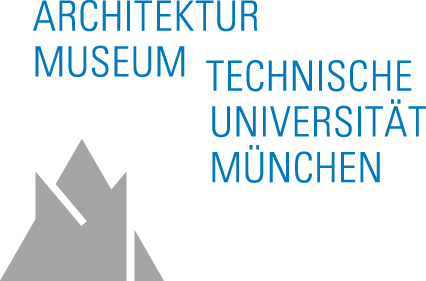
Architekturmuseum der Technischen Universität München logo

Architekturmuseum der Technischen Universität München is an architectural history research museum belonging to the Technical University of Munich in Munich, Bavaria, Germany. It is by far the largest collection of architectural exhibits in Germany. The main exhibition rooms of the museum are located in the same building as the Pinakothek der Moderne, with an additional branch office, called the Architekturmuseum Schwaben (Architecture Museum of Swabia), located in Augsburg.
