= Prinz-Carl-Palais =

Palace in Munich, Bavaria, Germany

Coordinates: 48°08′39″N 11°34′59″E

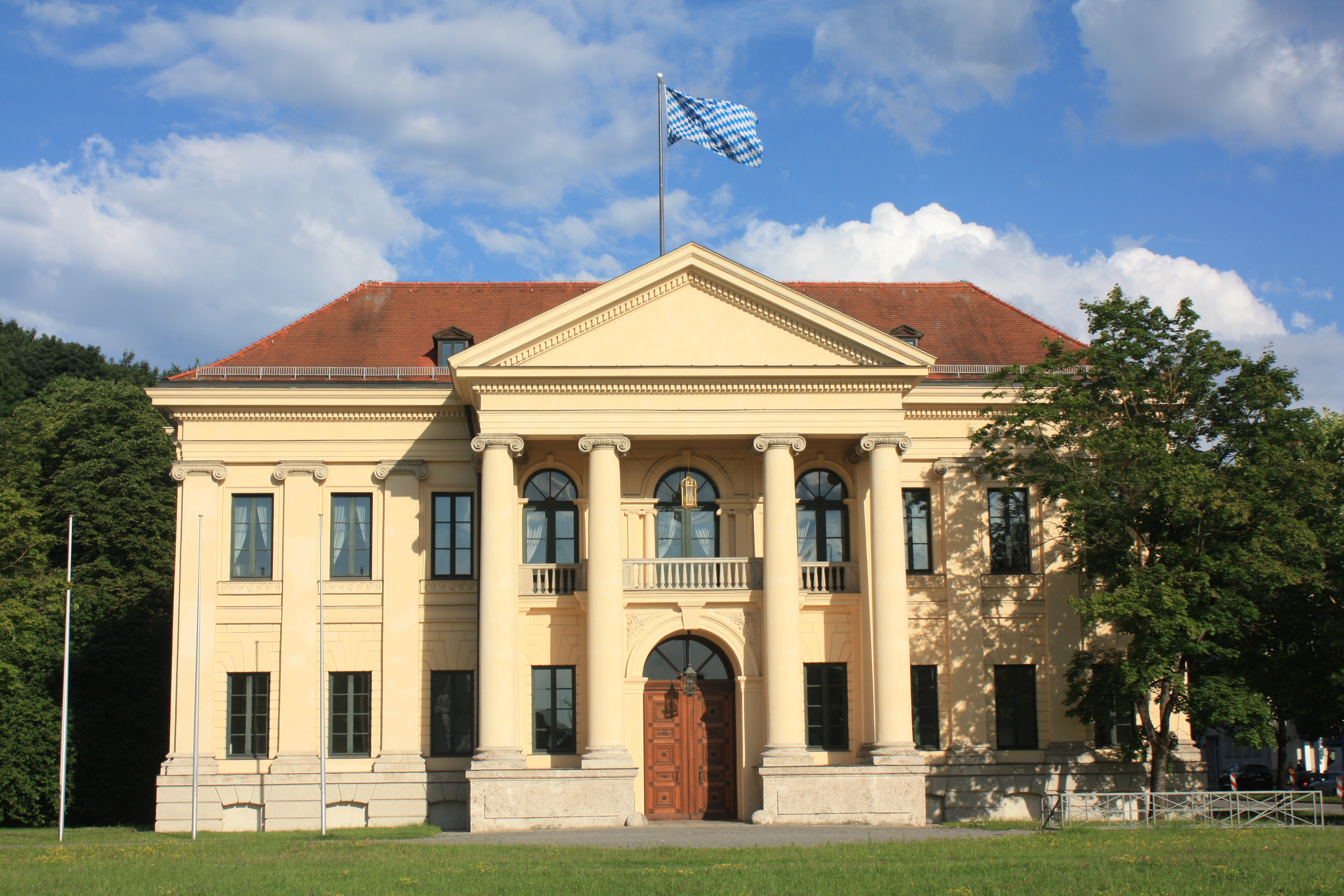
Prinz-Carl-Palais in Munich

The Prinz-Carl-Palais in Munich is a mansion built in the style of early Neoclassicism in 1804–1806. It was also known as the Palais Salabert and the Palais Royal, after its former owners.

The Prinz-Carl-Palais was planned in 1803 by the young architect Karl von Fischer for Abbé Pierre de Salabert, a former teacher of King Maximilian I Joseph of Bavaria. On the death of the Abbé Salabert in 1807, Maximilian I Joseph acquired the building. After his death in 1825, his son, Ludwig I, gave the building to his brother Prince Carl. He ordered Jean-Baptiste Métevier and Anton Schwanthaler to decorate the rooms. After Carl's death the Palais served as Diplomatic mission for Austria-Hungary from 1876 onwards before it became a residence for the Bavarian Prime Ministers in 1924.
