= List of German locations named after people and places of Turkish origin =

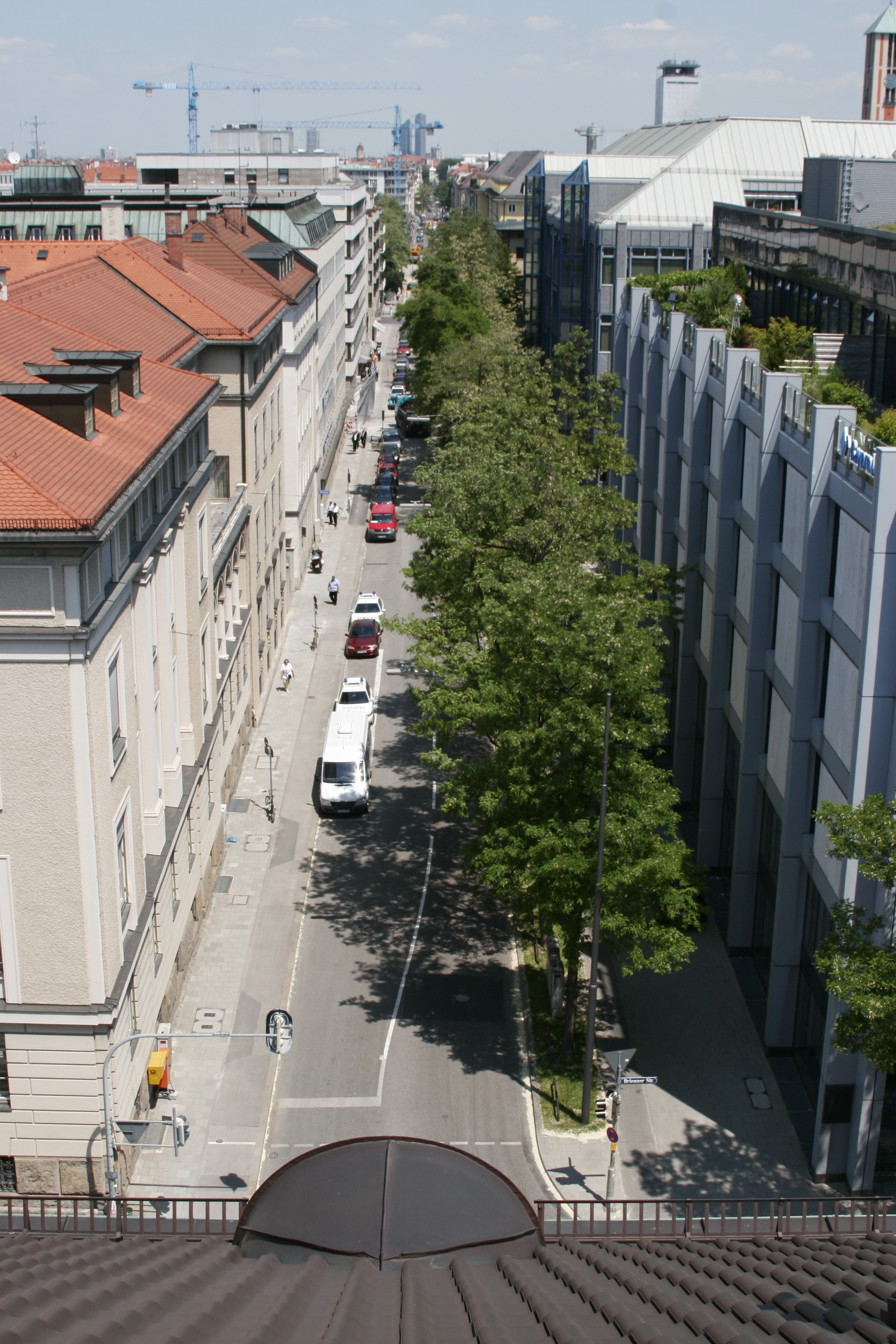
Türkenstraße ("Turks Street") in Munich.

This list includes streets and places in Germany named after people and places of Turkish origin, including Turkish Germans (especially in memory of victims of neo-Nazi murders), Turkish sister cities, and leading figures.

== Officially named locations ==
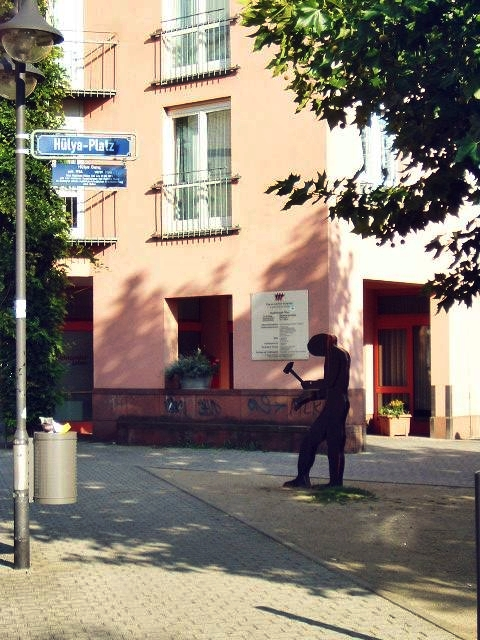
Hülya-Platz ("Hülya Square"), Frankfurt.

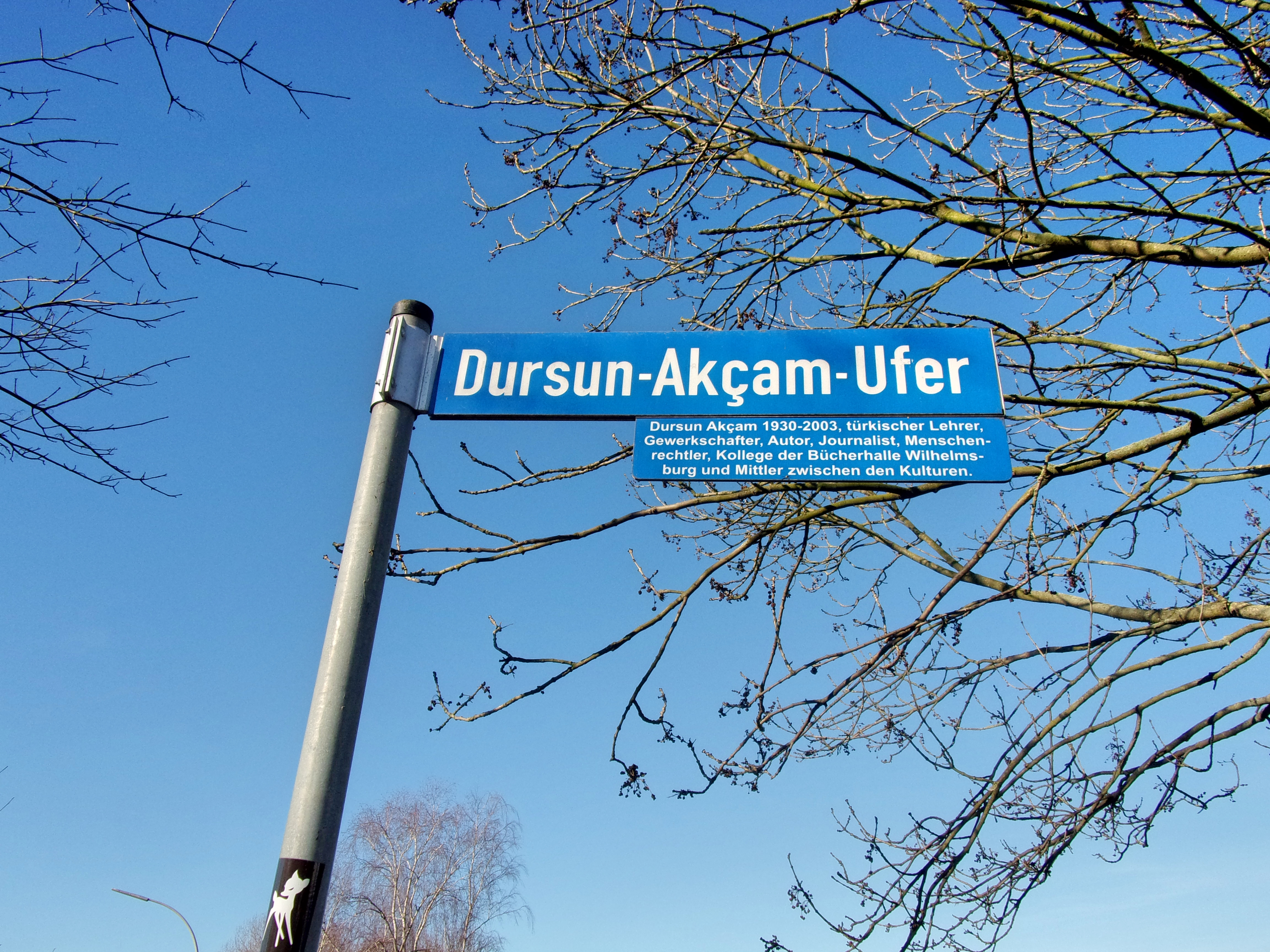
Dursun-Akçam-Ufer ("Dursun Akçam Bank"), Hamburg.

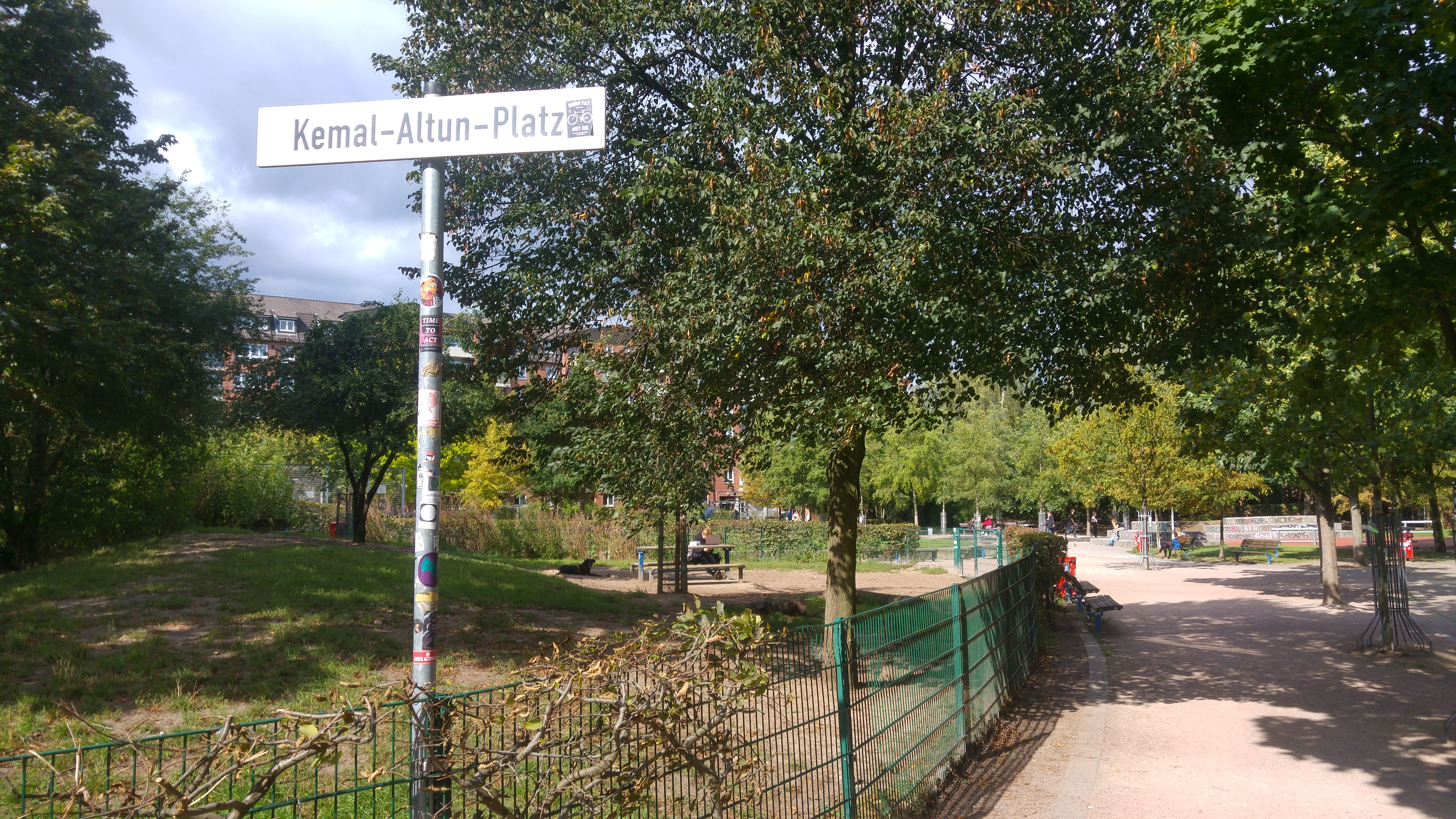
Kemal-Altun-Platz ("Kemal Altun Square"), Hamburg.

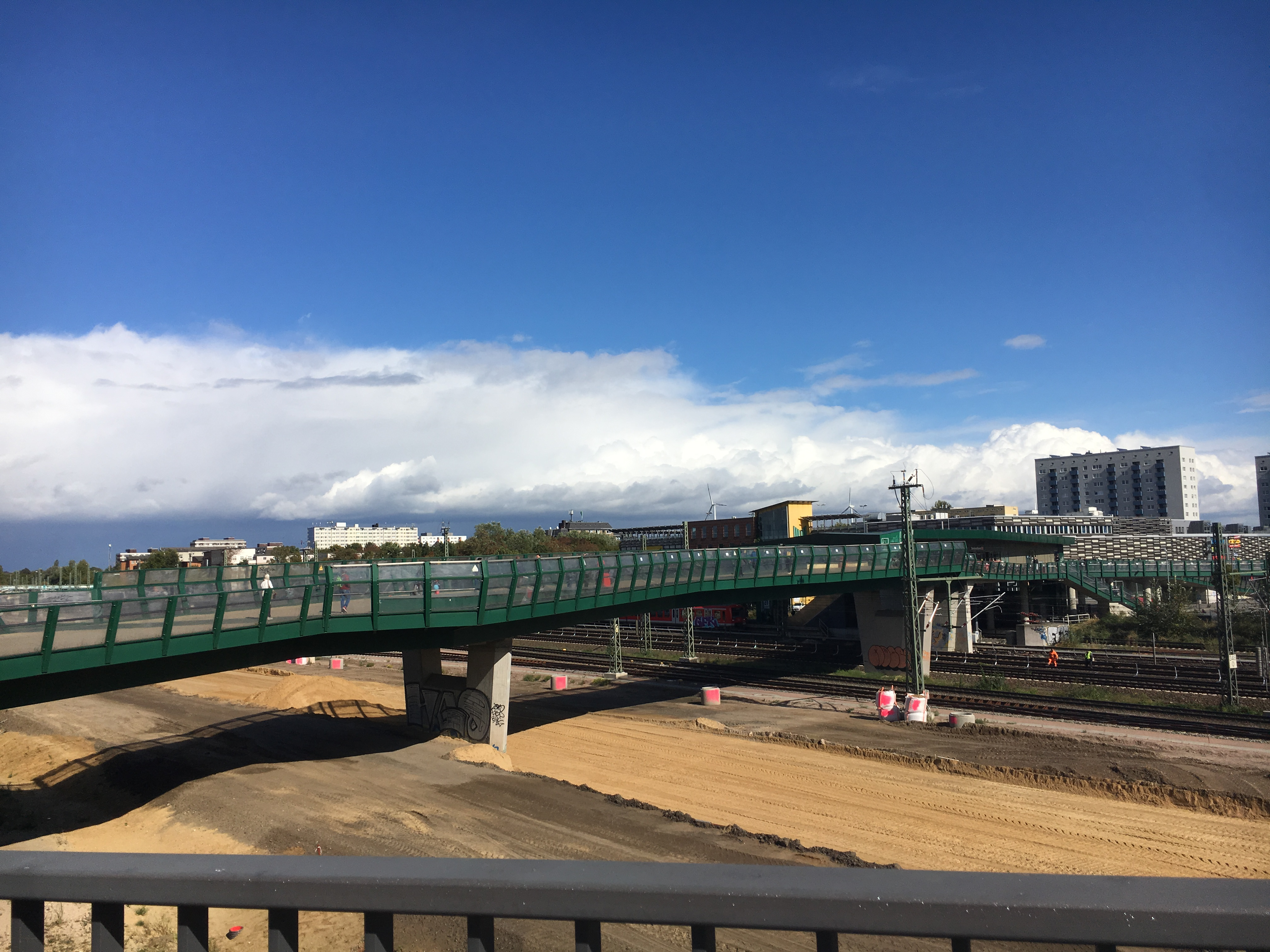
Muharrem-Acar-Brücke ("Muharrem Acar Bridge"), Hamburg.

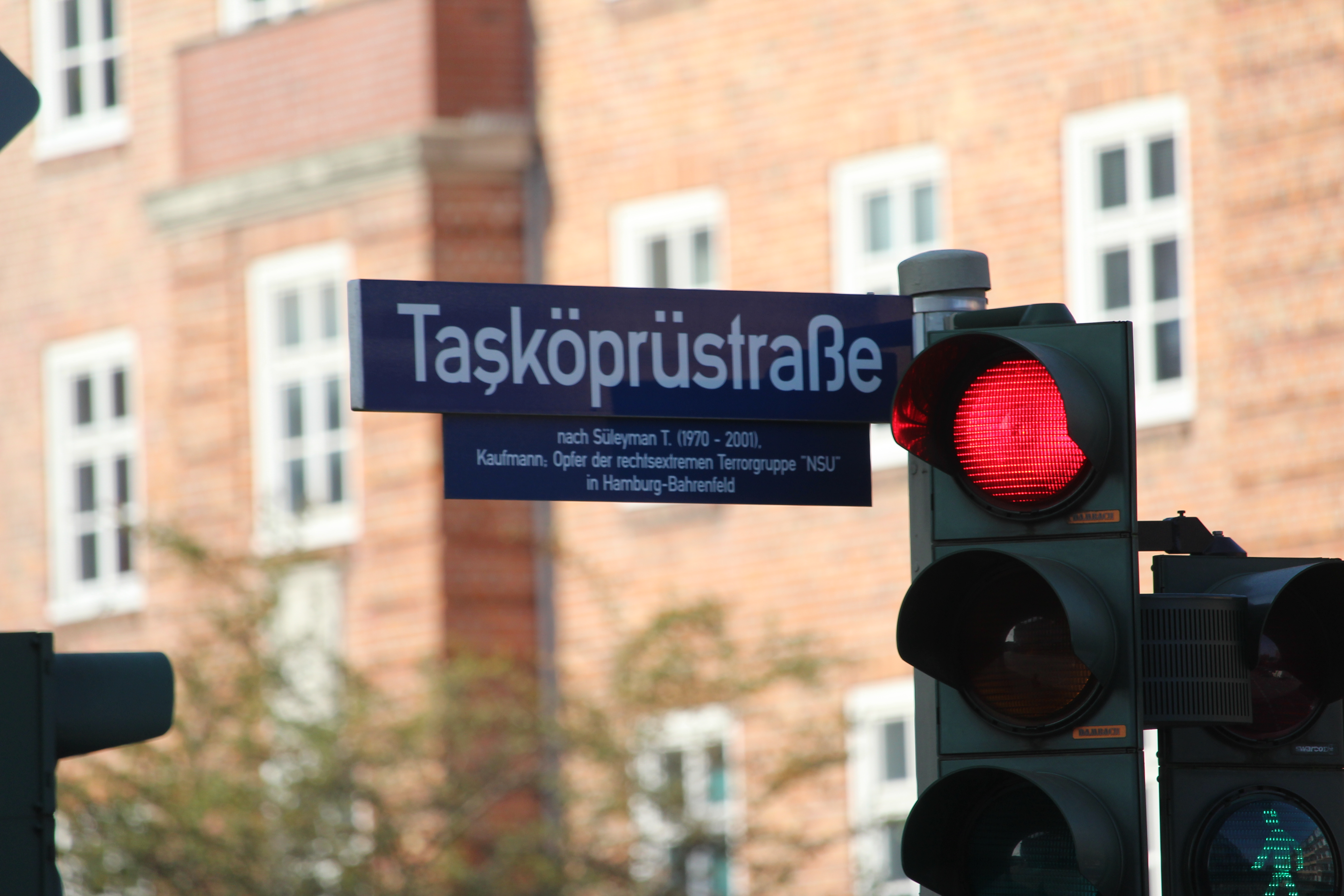
Tasköprüstraße ("Tasköprü Street"), Hamburg.

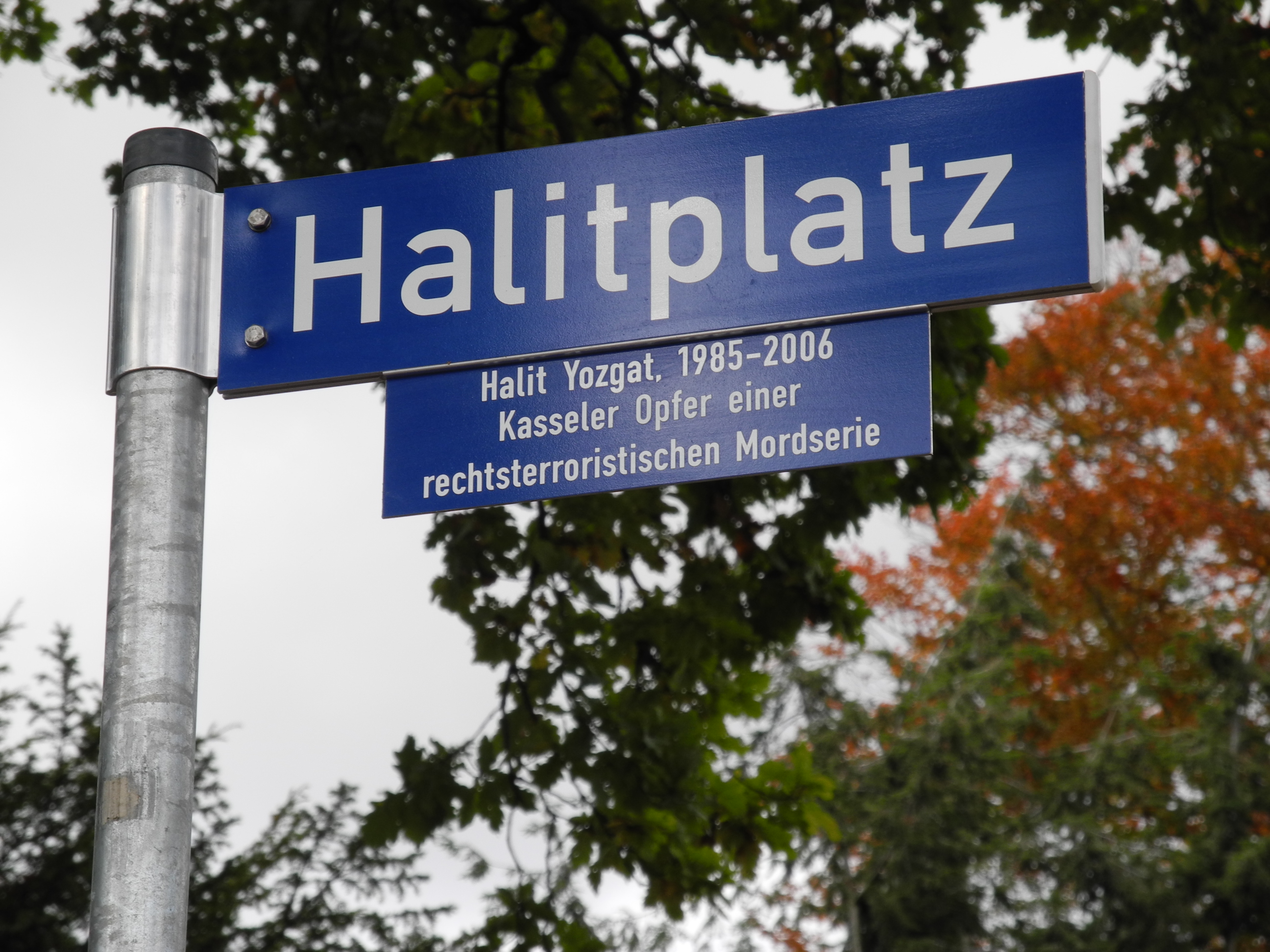
Halitplatz ("Halit Square"), Kassel.

=== Berlin ===
- Bosporusstraße ("Bosporus Street"): named after the Bosporus in 1931. The street is located in the Tempelhof-Schöneberg district.
- Dardanellenweg ("Dardanelles Path"): named after the strait of the Dardanelles, it is located in the Tempelhof-Schöneberg district in Mariendorf.
- Gallipoliweg ("Gallipoli Path"): named after Gallipoli, the street is in the Tempelhof-Schöneberg district in the Mariendorf.
- Goldenes Horn ("Golden Horn"): named after the Golden Horn, the street is located in the Tempelhof-Schöneberg district in Mariendorf.
- Marmarasweg ("Marmara Path"): named after the Marmara sea, the street is in the Tempelhof-Schöneberg district in Mariendorf.
- Türkenpfuhl ("Turks Lake"): is a small body of water in Berlin. It is located in the Neukölln district. The allotment gardening association "Am Türkenpfuhl" is located directly on the lake and a settlement also has the same name.
- Türkenstraße ("Turks Street"): located in the Wedding district and leads from Müllerstraße to Edinburger Straße. It was named on April 13, 1904, in memory of the so-called Turkish wars.

=== Bonn ===
- Yalovastraße ("Yalova Street"): named after the Turkish city of Yalova. Bad Godesberg, a borough of Bonn and Yalova have city/district friendship since 1969. Location: 50.68110°N 7.16048°E.

=== Cologne ===
- Bahide-Arslan-Straße ("Bahide Arslan Street"): named after Bahide Arslan who was a victim of the neo-Nazi Mölln arson attack in 1992. The street is located in the west of Cologne in the Ossendorf district and flows into Ossendorfer Weg. Location: 50.968755°N 6.886763°E.
- Istanbulstraße ("Istanbul Street"): named after the Turkish city of Istanbul. Cologne and Istanbul have been twin towns/sister cities since 1997. Location: 50.94567°N 6.99611°E.

=== Darmstadt ===
- Bursastraße ("Bursa Street"): named after the Turkish city of Bursa. Darmstadt and Bursa have been twin towns/sister cities since 1971 and it is the oldest twin towns/sister cities relations between Germany and Turkey. Location: 49.80870°N 8.65760°E.

=== Dortmund ===
- Platz von Trabzon ("Trabzon Square"): named after the Turkish city of Trabzon. Dortmund and Trabzon have been twin towns/sister cities since 2013. Location: 51.51402°N 7.45494°E.

=== Duisburg ===
- Fakir-Baykurt-Platz ("Fakir Baykurt Square"): named after the Turkish German writer Fakir Baykurt. The square is located in the Homberg district at the southern end of Schillerstrasse. Location: 51.450451°N 6.705781°E.

=== Frankfurt ===
- Eskişehir Platz ("Eskişehir Square"): named after the Turkish city of Eskişehir. Frankfurt and Eskişehir have been twin towns/sister cities since 2013. It was inaugurated by then mayor Peter Feldmann in 2021. This square is located in Bornheim district between subway stations of Bornheim Mitte and Burgstraße. Location: 50.12732°N 8.70677°E.

Eskişehir also made a Frankfurt Meydanı (Frankfurt Square) in 2023 on the occasion of the 10-year anniversary of town twinning between both cities. The square is located at Eskişehir Kentpark, which is one of the beloved parks in the city.

- Hülya-Platz ("Hülya Square"): named after Hülya Genç, a 9-year-old girl, who was a victim of the 1993 Solingen arson attack. The small square is located in the Bockenheim district between Friesengasse and Kleiner Seestrasse. It is the first place that commemorates a victim of neo-Nazis. Location: 50.123733°N 8.639647°E.

=== Fürstenfeldbruck ===
- Türkenfeld ("Turks Field"): is a municipality in the district of Fürstenfeldbruck in Bavaria.
- Türkenfeld station: is a railway station in Türkenfeld.

=== Hamburg ===
- Dursun-Akçam-Ufer ("Dursun Akçam Bank"): named after Dursun Akçam, a Turkish teacher. The footpath leads along the Vering Canal in Wilhelmsburg. Location: 53.51284°N 9.98399°E.
- Kemal-Altun-Platz ("Keman Altun Square"): named after the political refugee Cemal Kemal Altun. Located in the middle of Ottensen, it had long been named after Altun, including by the Hamburg Parliament, prior to its official naming. Location: 53.552490°N 9.926024°E.
- Muharrem-Acar-Brücke ("Muharrem Acar Bridge"): named after the immigrant Muharrem Acar. The bridge crosses the railroad tracks at Wilhelmsburg station. Location: 53.49771°N 10.00636°E.
- Ramazan-Avci-Platz ("Ramazan Avci Square"): named after Ramazan Avcı, who was killed by members of the right-wing extremist skinhead scene. The square is located at the Landwehr station in the Hohenfelde district. Location: 53.561260°N 10.036921°E.
- Tasköprüstraße ("Tasköprü Street"): named after Süleyman Taşköprü, a victim of the right-wing neo-Nazi extremist terror group National Socialist Underground. The street in Bahrenfeld runs parallel to the street where Taşköprü was shot in his father's shop. Location: 53.561597°N 9.930748°E.

=== Hamm ===
- Afyonring: named after the Turkish city of Afyonkarahisar which has been one of Hamm's partner cities since 2007. The Afyonring connects Heessener Straße with the Sachsenweg/Sachsenring roundabout. Location: 51.69677°N 7.82082°E.

=== Helmstedt ===
- Türkentor ("Turks' Gate"): is a triumphal arch and gateway in Helmstedt in Lower Saxony. The arch was built in 1716 to celebrate the victory over the Ottomans by Prince Eugene of Savoy at the Battle of Petrovaradin.

=== Kassel ===
- Halitplatz ("Halit Square"): is named after Halit Yozgat who was murdered by neo-Nazis on 6 April 2006. It is located near the crime scene on Holländische Straße 81 and was inaugurated on October 1, 2012. Location: 51.326741°N 9.499583°E.
- Kemal-Altun-Platz ("Kemal Altun Square"): named after the political refugee Cemal Kemal Altun. The square is located in the north of Kassel at the confluence of Gottschalkstrasse and Mombachstrasse and was named in 1988. Location: 51.326633°N 9.503701°E.

=== Kiel ===
- Bahide-Arslan-Platz ("Bahide Arslan Square"): named after Bahide Arslan who was a victim of the neo-Nazi Mölln arson attack in 1992. The square is located in the Gaarden-Ost district, roughly where Wikingerstraße joins Kaiserstraße, about 250 m southwest of the Volkspark. Location: 54.312360°N 10.149243°E.

=== Mölln ===
- Bahide-Arslan-Gang ("Bahide Arslan Path"): named after Bahide Arslan who was a victim of the neo-Nazi Mölln arson attack in 1992. The footpath connects the city centre with the spa gardens. Location: 53.628164°N 10.691522°E.

=== Munich ===
- Türkengraben ("Turks Trench"): the builder of the trench was Maximilian II Emanuel, Elector of Bavaria (1662–1726). The aim was to connect the Munich residence with the Schleissheim Palace. The electoral geometer Mathias Paur planned the canal in 1701, and construction began in May 1702.
- Türkenstraße ("Turks Street"): the 1.3 km long street runs from the Brienner Straße in a northeasterly direction and ends at the border of the district Schwabing, in the Georgenstraße.
- Türkentor ("Turks' Gate"): is a gatehouse built in 1826 for the Royal Bavarian Infantry Lifeguards Regiment.

=== Nuremberg ===
- Antalyastraße ("Antalya Street"): named after the Turkish city of Antalya. Nuremberg and Antalya have been twin towns/sister cities since 1997. Location: 49.46901°N 11.07914°E

=== Regensburg ===
- Fröhliche-Türken-Straße ("Happy Turks Street"): It was given in 1686, when many Ottoman war prisoners were brought to Munich and many of them were distributed to surrounding areas. In Regensburg, many people noticed the happy lifestyle of Turks, so that the street was named after it. Location: 49.01601°N 12.09803°E

== Planning stage ==
=== Berlin ===
- Atatürk-Straße ("Atatürk Street"): to be named after Mustafa Kemal Atatürk, founder of the Republic of Turkey, who provided asylum to Ernst Reuter (who later became mayor of West Berlin) during Nazi rule.

=== Munich ===
- Fethi-Savaşçı-Straße ("Fethi Savaşçı Street"): to be named after the Munich writer, Fethi Savaşçı, who came to Germany in 1965 as a factory worker.

== Activism and unofficially named streets ==
In 2018 left-wing activists renamed over 200 street signs to the names of the victims who were killed during a series of xenophobic murders by the neo-Nazi terrorist group the National Socialist Underground. In a statement, the Interventionistische Linke (IL) said: "We want to make the extent of racist violence visible and show respect for the victims of the NSU and their families."

== See also ==
- Turks in Germany
- List of Turkish Germans
