= Türkenstraße =

Road in Munich, Germany

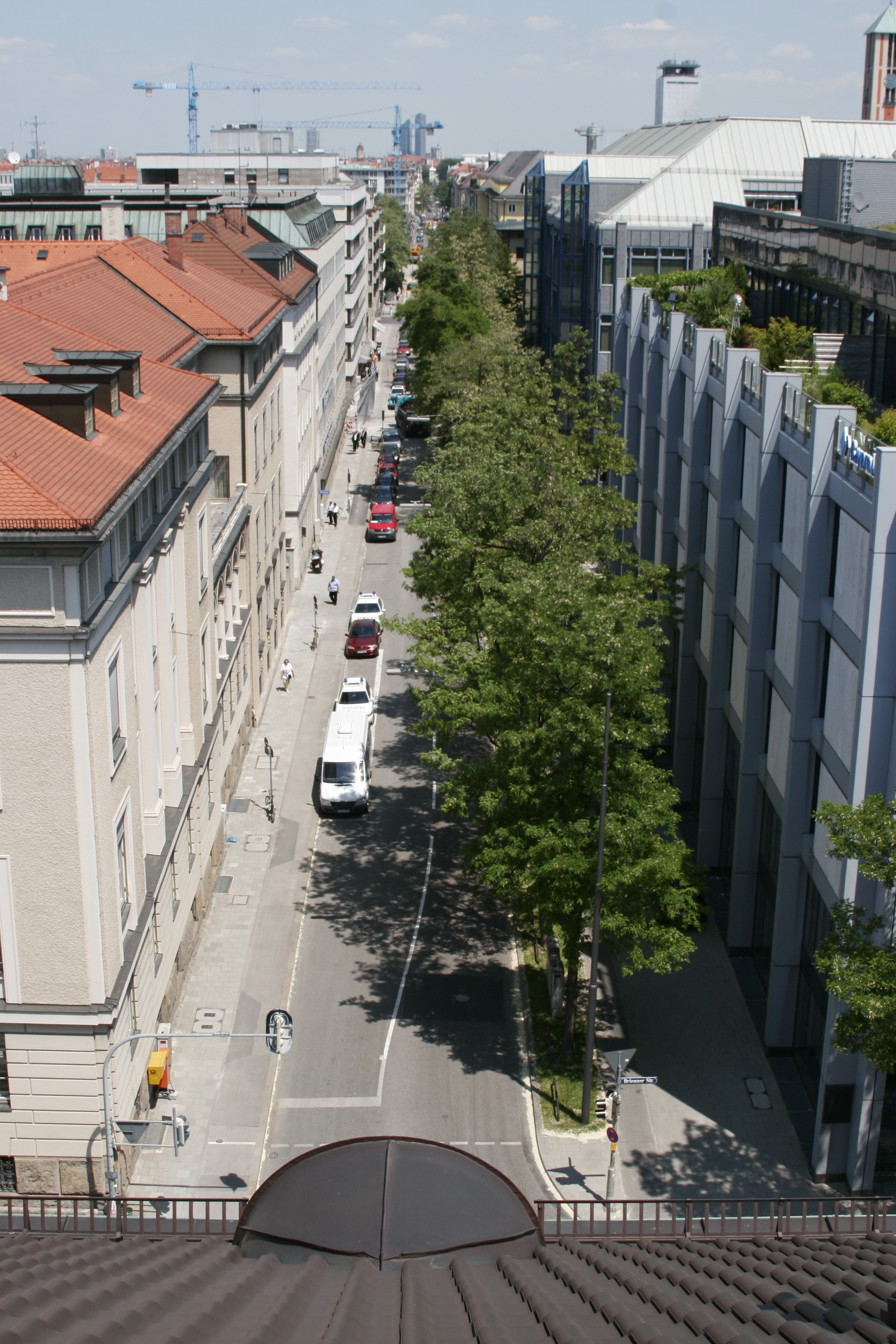

- Location within Germany
- Namesake: Türkengraben
- Length: 1,300 m (4,300 ft)
- Location: Munich
- Postal code: 80333
- Nearest metro station: Türkenstraße (Bus 153)
- Major junctions: Brienner Straße (Munich), Prinz-Ludwig-Straße, Gabelsbergerstraße, Theresienstraße, Schellingstraße, Blütenstraße, Adalbertstraße, Akademiestraße, Rambergstraße, Georgenstraße

The Türkenstraße is an inner city street in Munich's district Maxvorstadt. It is named after the Türkengraben (Turkish moat) to which it ran. In the list of historical monuments in Munich, more than 30 objects are listed in the Türkenstraße.

== Location ==
The 1.3 km long Türkenstraße runs from the Brienner Straße in a northeasterly direction and ends at the border of the district Schwabing, in the Georgenstraße.

== History ==
The approval of the street name in 1812 by royal rescript of Max I. is the first nomination as Türkenstraße.

In 1823, the Türkenkaserne (Turkish barracks) were built on the area between Barer, Gabelsberger, Türkenstraße and Theresienstraße. Infantry regiments were initially stationed here, so the barracks was used by the Bavarian State Police after the First World War, which gave way during the Drittes Reich of the Wehrmacht. After civilian use in the post-war period, the barracks were demolished in the 1960s. All that remains today is the historically protected Türkentor. On the site today are various museums, including the Pinakothek der Moderne, and university institutes located.

As of 1848, on the corner of Brienner Straße stood the Wittelsbacher Palais. Originally built as a Crown Prince's Palace for Max I, however, immediately after its completion it became the retirement seat of Ludwig I and later the residence of Ludwig III. After a varied history as a meeting place for the Soviet Republic and Gestapo headquarters, it was destroyed by a bombing in 1944. In 1964, the remaining ruins were removed and the Bayerische Landesbank was built on its location.

In 1874, August von Voit set up a simultan school, where boys and girls of different faiths were equally received. After severe damage in the Second World War, the school was renovated several times and received its present appearance in the 1950s. Today, in the building with the number 68, is a primary school with a Schülerhort (daycare) and after school program, as well as a municipal kindergarten. The square next to the school was named after Georg Elser.

In 1903, Kathi Kobus opened the cabaret restaurant Simplicissimus in the premises of the former Crown Prince Rudolf. Karl Valentin appeared regularly there in 1907, other regular guests included Frank Wedekind, Ludwig Thoma, Thomas Theodor Heine and Julius Beck. Erich Mühsam and Joachim Ringelnatz were so-called house poets and until the destruction in 1944, the Simplicissimus was a central starting point for the Munich, in particular the Schwabinger, cultural scene.

Today, the Turkenstraße is located next to many restaurants, the Museum Brandhorst and a police inspection office.

== Historical monuments on Türkenstraße ==
Historically significant protected monuments on the Türkenstraße are, for example, the Palais Dürckheim (a former aristocratic palace and later Prussian legation), the Türkentor (entrance gate of the former Turkish barracks) or the Old Simpl. In addition, there are numerous rental buildings from the 19th century, which were designed in neo-barock or neo-Renaissance styles.

== Literature ==
- Hugo Müller: Ein Münchner erinnert sich - Türkenstraße 26. Hugendubel, Munich 1989. ISBN 3-88034-453-1
- Hella Schlumberger: Türkenstraße - Vorstadt und Hinterhof - Eine Chronik erzählt. Buchendorfer, Munich 1998. ISBN 3-927984-79-5 / Schmelcher, Munich 2003. ISBN 3-00-012735-6
- Sepp Hödl: Die Türkenstraße - gestern und heute. Munich 1990.
