= Türkentor =

Türkentor (Turks' Gate) may refer to one of two buildings in Germany:

- Türkentor (Helmstedt)
- Türkentor (Munich)
