= Georgenstraße =

Street in Munich, Germany

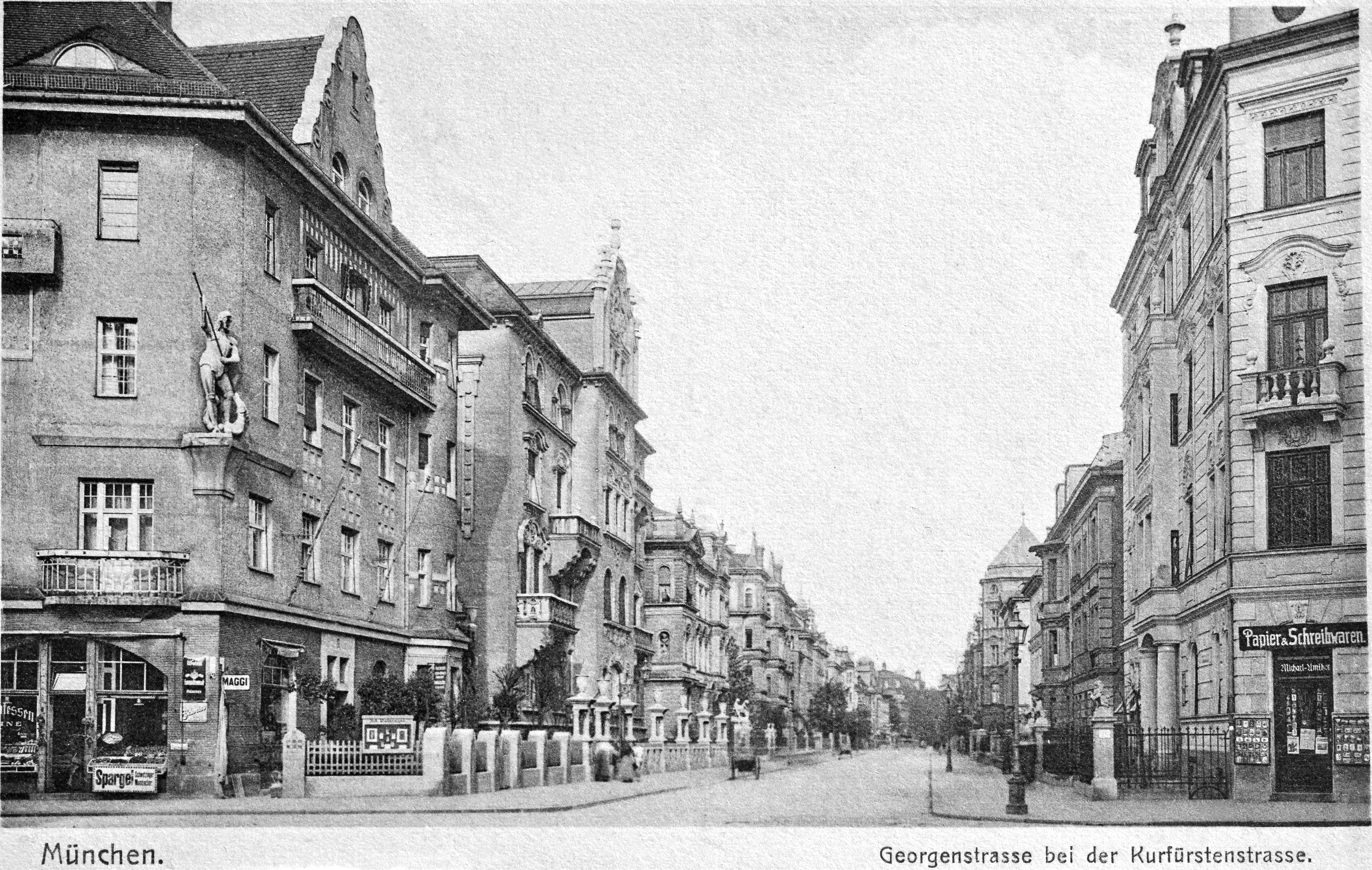
- View into the Georgenstraße at the crossing with the Kurfürstenstraße, around 1900

- Location within Germany
- Length: 1,750 m (5,740 ft)
- Location: Munich=
- Postal code: 80799
- Nearest metro station: Giselastraße (U6)
- Coordinates: 48.15577°N 11.57328°E
- Major junctions: Leopoldstraße, Friedrichstraße, Türkenstraße, Kürfürstenstraße, Nordendstraße, Schraudolphstraße, Arcisstraße, Isabellastraße, Daimlerstraße, Tengstraße, Adelheidstraße, Hiltenspergerstraße, Schwarzmannstraße, Zentnerstraße, Schleißheimer Straße, Winzererstraße, Lothstraße

The Georgenstraße (German pronunciation: [ˈɡeːɔʁɡn̩ˌʃtʁaːsə]) is a street in Munich, Germany and runs in an east-west direction north of the city center. It separates the Maxvorstadt in the south from Schwabing in the north. It leads from Leopoldstraße in the east to Lothstraße in the west. In the street, especially at the beginning are several magnificent buildings, in the western direction are simple rental units. The Georgenstraße has little traffic significance and it is quiet despite its relative proximity to the city center; apartments, small shops, cafes and other small businesses are found there.

== History ==
The closed development of Maxvorstadt in the middle of the 19th century, extended from the city center only to the Adalbertstraße, a southern parallel street of Georgenstraße. The Georgenstraße was created between agricultural land areas and was initially referred to as "Tambosi-Anger". Since 1851, the plots were parceled along this dirt road, the way served since then as a shortcut or "Schleichweg" between the Leopoldstraße and the Nordendstraße.

On 13 November 1856, the mayor Kaspar von Steinsdorf in the police report announced that from 21 November 1856 the connection route should be known as Georgenstraße. The question of name sake and meaning remains unclear. Karl Rambaldi explains that the road in the direction of the former swimming school, in the Georgenschwaige in Riesenfeld 2 would have led to the name. Zauner also speak for this naming. Dollinger left the name to this day unchanged.

The Georgenstraße formed, for a long time, the northernmost east-west road on Munich city, in front of the Burgfriedensgrenze to the, then independent, village of Schwabing. From the address book for Munich of 1859, houses numbered 1 to 17 were listed.

Also, a subsequent address book from 1861 lists the then local residents and the buildings and assigns them to the municipality Maxvorstadt.

In the years from 1866 to 1891, the Georgenstraße was extended to just before the Winzererstraße around the newly created building groups, starting from the Türkengraben in the western direction to allow a connection point. From then on, it also crosses the district of Schwabing.

Starting in 1873, the area between Adalbertstraße, Georgenstraße, the then Schwabinger Landstraße (now Leopoldstraße) and the Türkengraben (today Nordendstraße) was developed by a construction company.

With the incorporation of Schwabing in 1890, the Georgenstraße formed the northern boundary of Maxvorstadt to the new district of Schwabing, before the border line to Schwabing was further north along the present Hohenzollernstraße, Ainmillerstraße and Elisabethstraße. Due to the border function of the road between Maxvorstadt and Schwabing, currently the odd numbered houses are in Maxvorstadt and the houses with even numbers are in Schwabing.

Even in 1905, the Georgenstraße formed the northern boundary of the settlement of Maxvorstadt, since between the Georgenstraße and the Hohenzollernstraße were only sporadic buildings.

== Cartography ==
In the plan of the royal capital and residence state Munich, in all its truce shown from 1858/59, the Georgenstraße is completely noted. In the fourth edition of Meyers Conversations Lexicon of 1888, the Georgenstraße can be seen in sections on the map of Munich from Leopoldstraße. In the fourteenth edition of the Brockhaus Conversation Lexicon of 1891, the street is already presented with a sizeable number of buildings.

== Transport history ==
Until 1906, the tram line crossed the Georgenstraße with a yellow and red light from the stop Schleißheimer / Georgenstraße to the East Cemetery. After the conversion of the line colors to "Arabic" line numbers from 12 October 1906, this became the line number 7. Also starting from this time, the line 17 traveled in a deviating direction from the line 7 up to the east cemetery. Since 1904, the line 8 travels to the Riesenfeld in Milbertshofen. A separate track along the Georgenstraße never existed. However, in 1917 at the house group Schleißheimer road, coming from the Görresstraße on to the Georgenstraße and Zentnerstraße a reverse loop was constructed, but this was not rebuilt after the war.

== Current traffic connection ==
- The underground station Giselastraße has a southern exit to the stop Georgenstraße of the city bus line 154.
- From the underground station Josephsplatz there are two exits to Georgenstraße.
- The stop Nordendstraße of the Munich tram is located a few meters south of the Georgenstraße.

== Historical buildings ==
Directly on the Georgenstraße are 37 historical monuments.

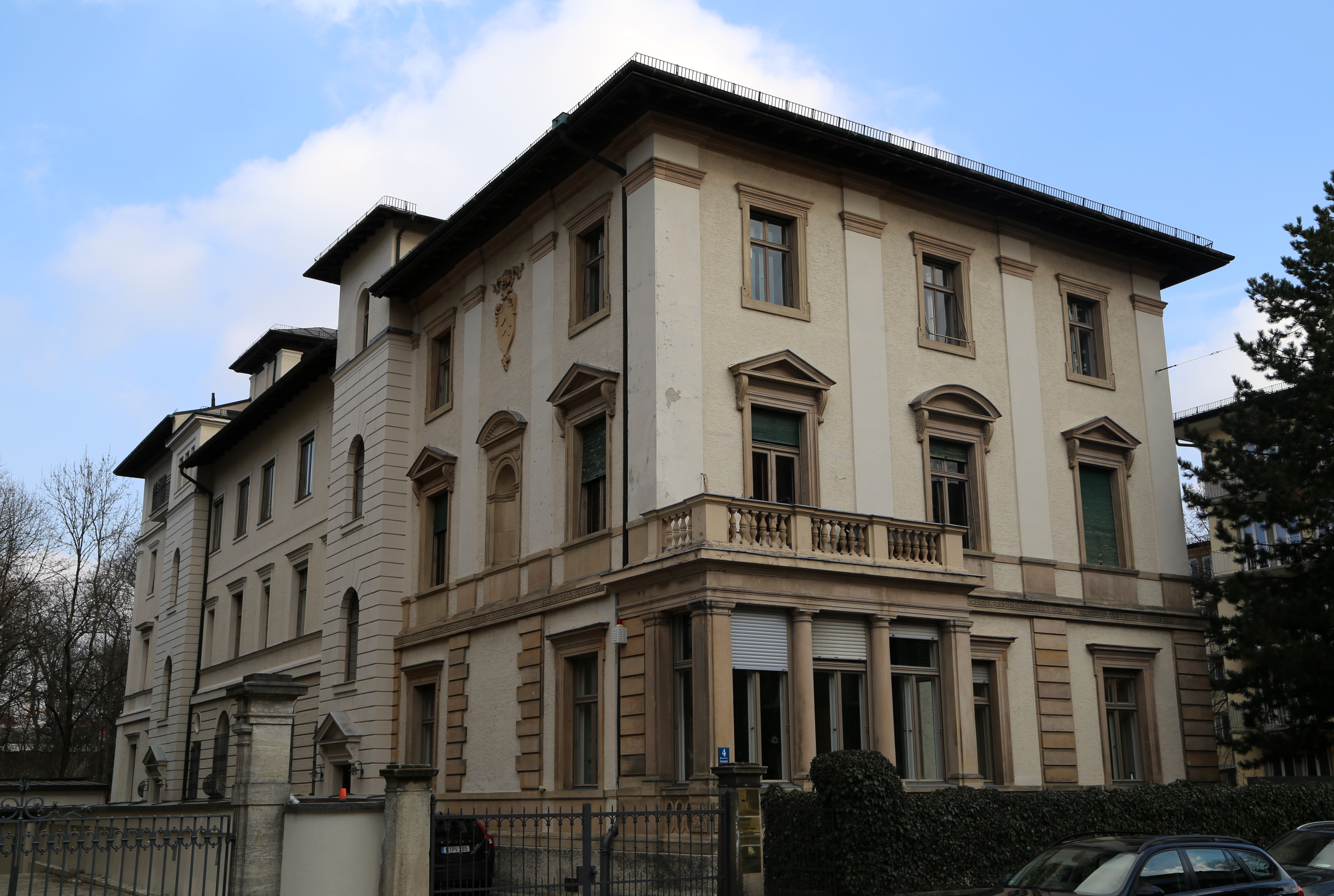
Nr. 4: Piper Verlag

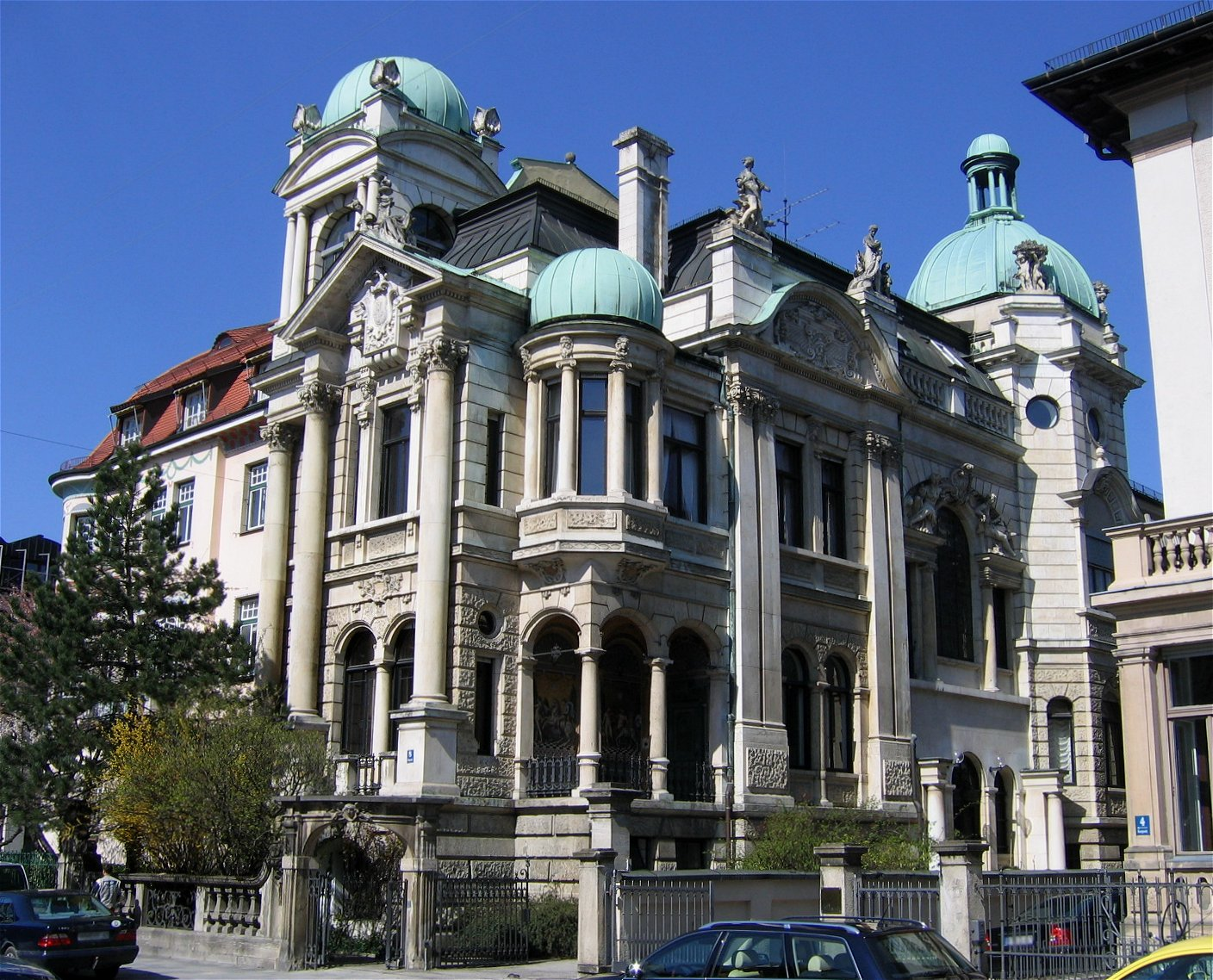
Nr. 8: Pacelli-Palais

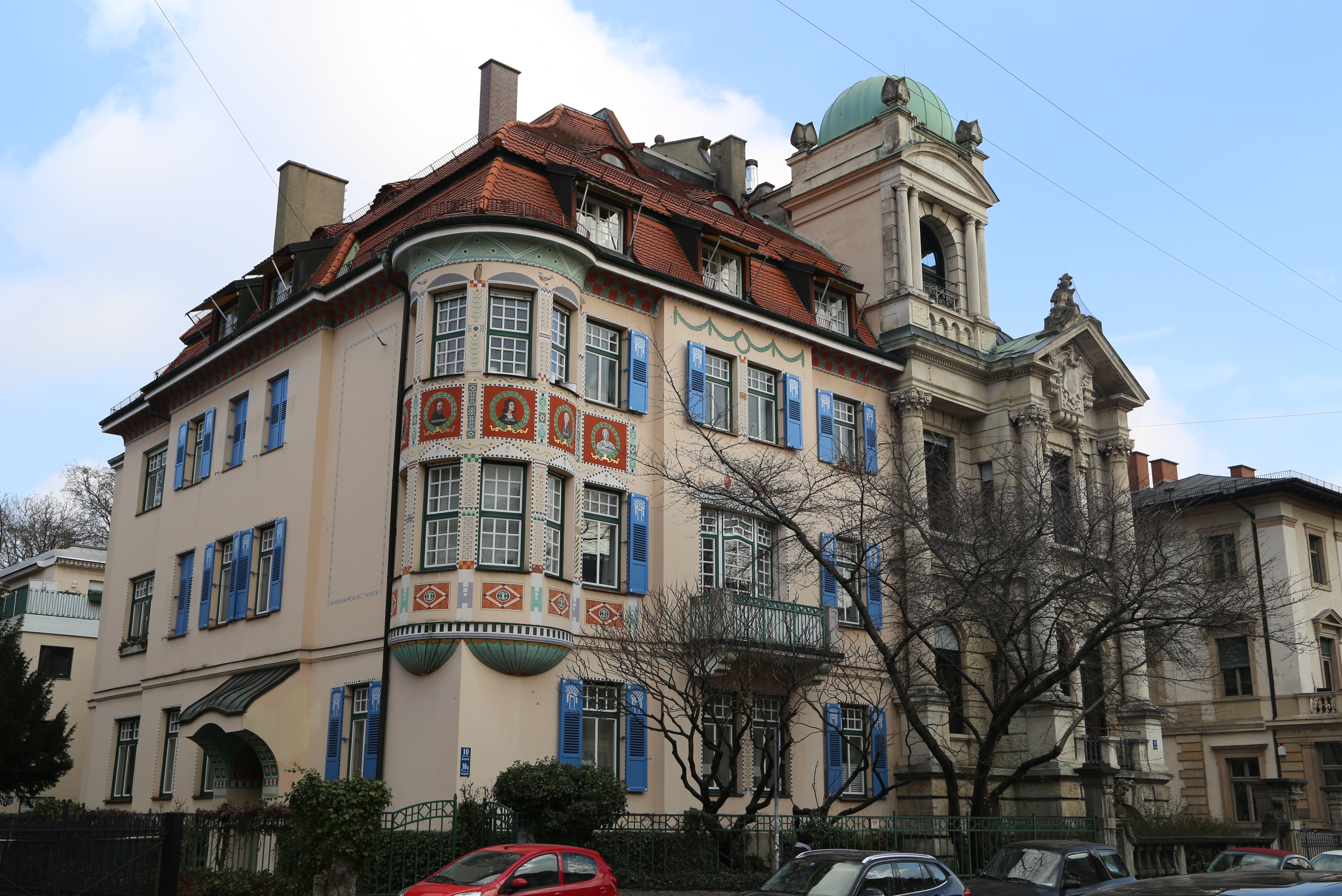
Nr. 10: Palais Bissing

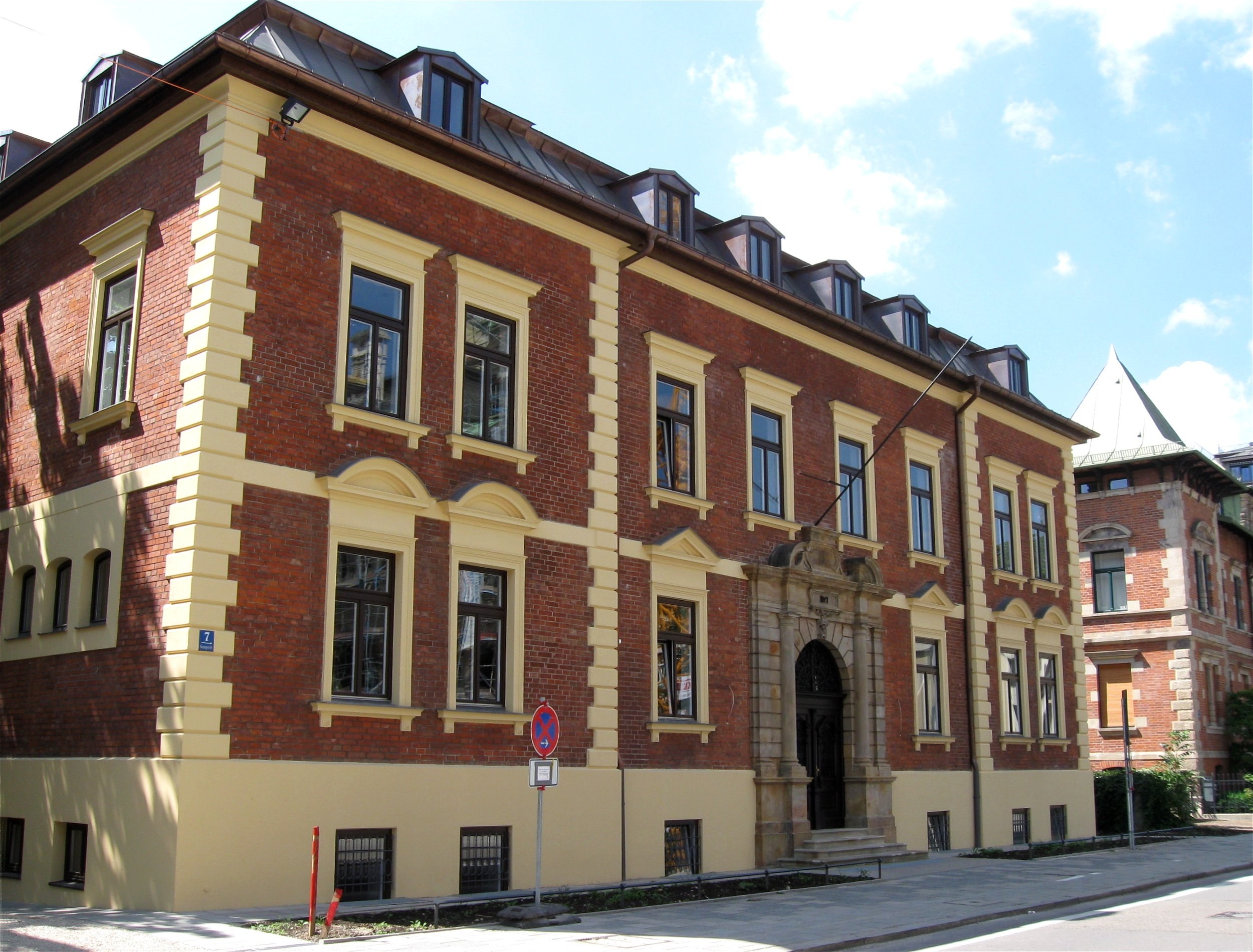
Nr. 7: Villa-like Neo-Renaissance building

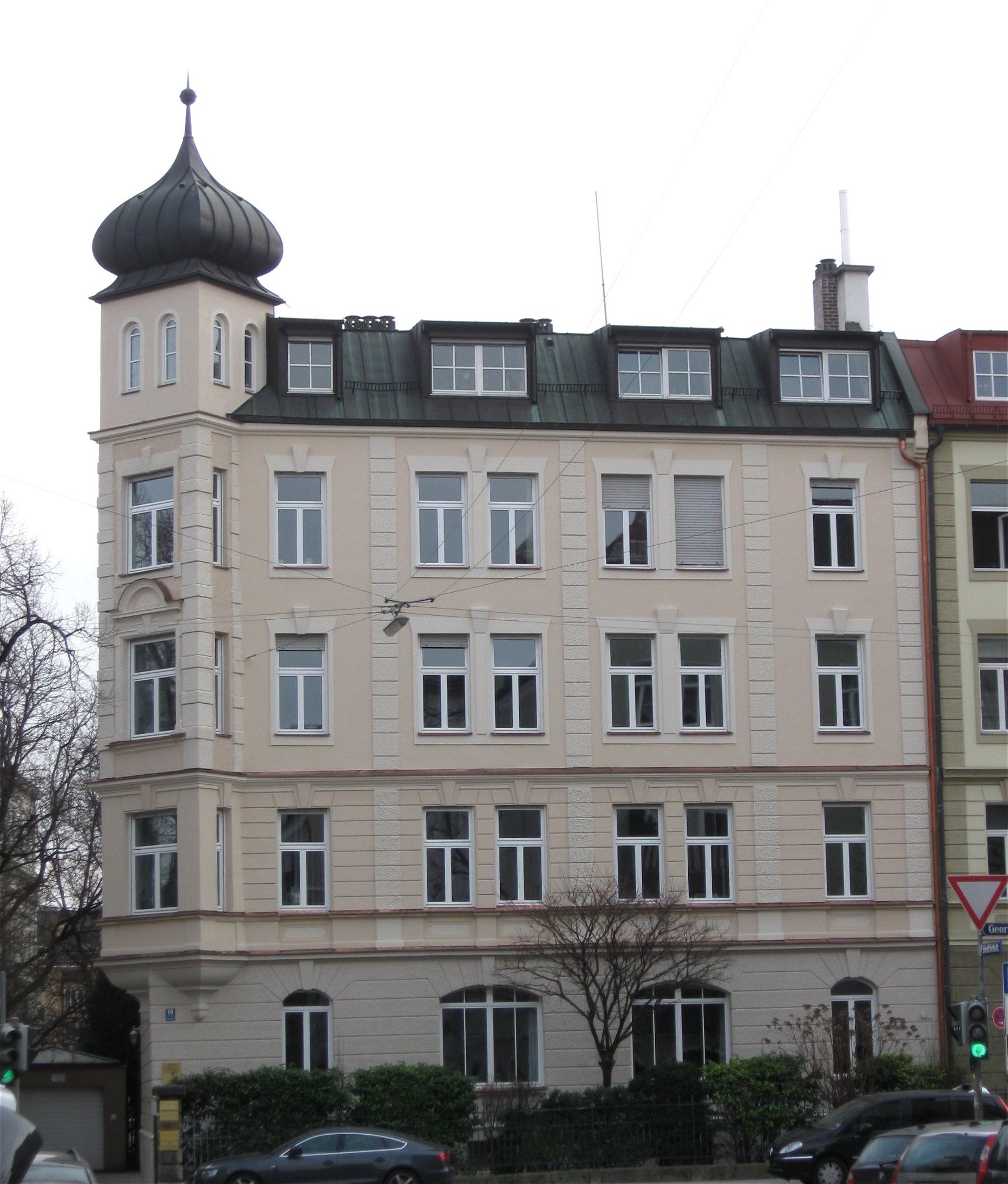
Nr. 19: Rental house on the corner of Türkenstraße

== Other notable houses ==
- In the house on Georgenstraße 4, since 1935 is the seat of the Piper publishing house. The building was damaged during World War II.
- In the house on Georgenstraße 13, lived the art historian and patron Robert von Ritter, from 1898 until the destruction of the house in the Second World War

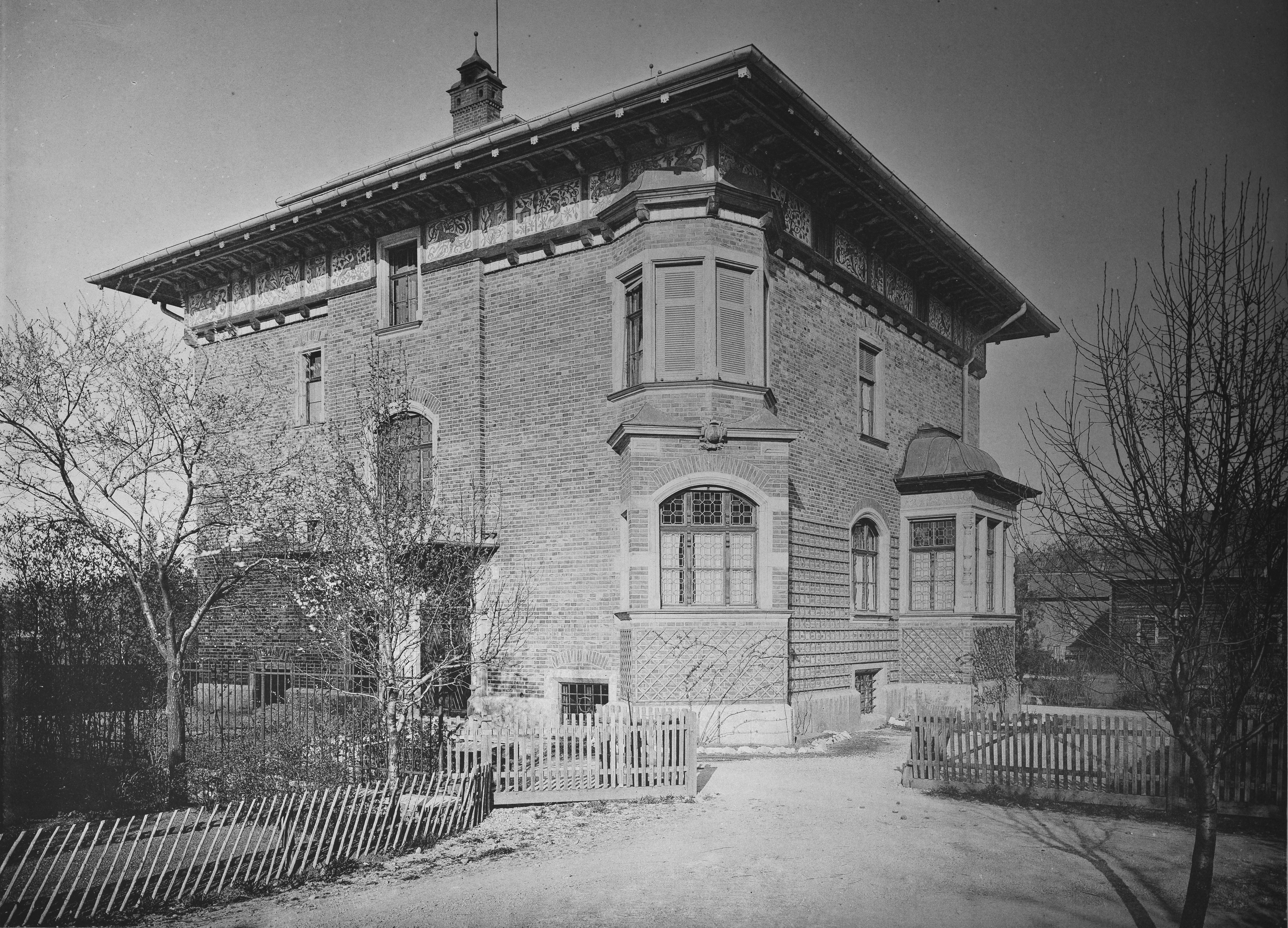
Former residence Friedrich von Thiersch (1890–1945)

- In 1889, the Georgenstraße number 18 (15a, old numbering) housed the most famous resident of its time, the architect Friedrich von Thiersch. The Thiersch residential building was destroyed during the Second World War.
- In the house Georgenstraße 16, the Slovenian Anton Ažbe maintained a painting school that attracted artists who later became world famous. Among them were Wassily Kandinsky and Alexej von Jawlensky. Among other things, they studied technique and color theory with Ažbe. His pupil Kandinsky lived from 1898-1901 near the painting school in Georgenstraße 35.
- In the house Georgenstraße 24, Lion and Marta Feuchtwanger had a condominium in 1917.
- In the house Georgenstraße 34 lived the German-Jewish composer and conductor Werner R. Heymann (1896-1961). He lived there, off and on, after his return from exile in Hollywood from 1951 until his death. In addition to the famous film music, Heymann's work also includes operettas and stage music. Unforgotten are his songs from the UFA film "The Three from the Filling Station (1930 film)", which was remade in 1955.
- In the house Georgenstraße 35 lived "Hitler’s first enemy" Konrad Heiden from the summer of 1919.
- In the house Georgenstraße 71, there is an additional synagogue of the Munich Jewish Community.
