= St. Ludger's Abbey =

Coordinates: 52°13′34″N 11°00′56″E

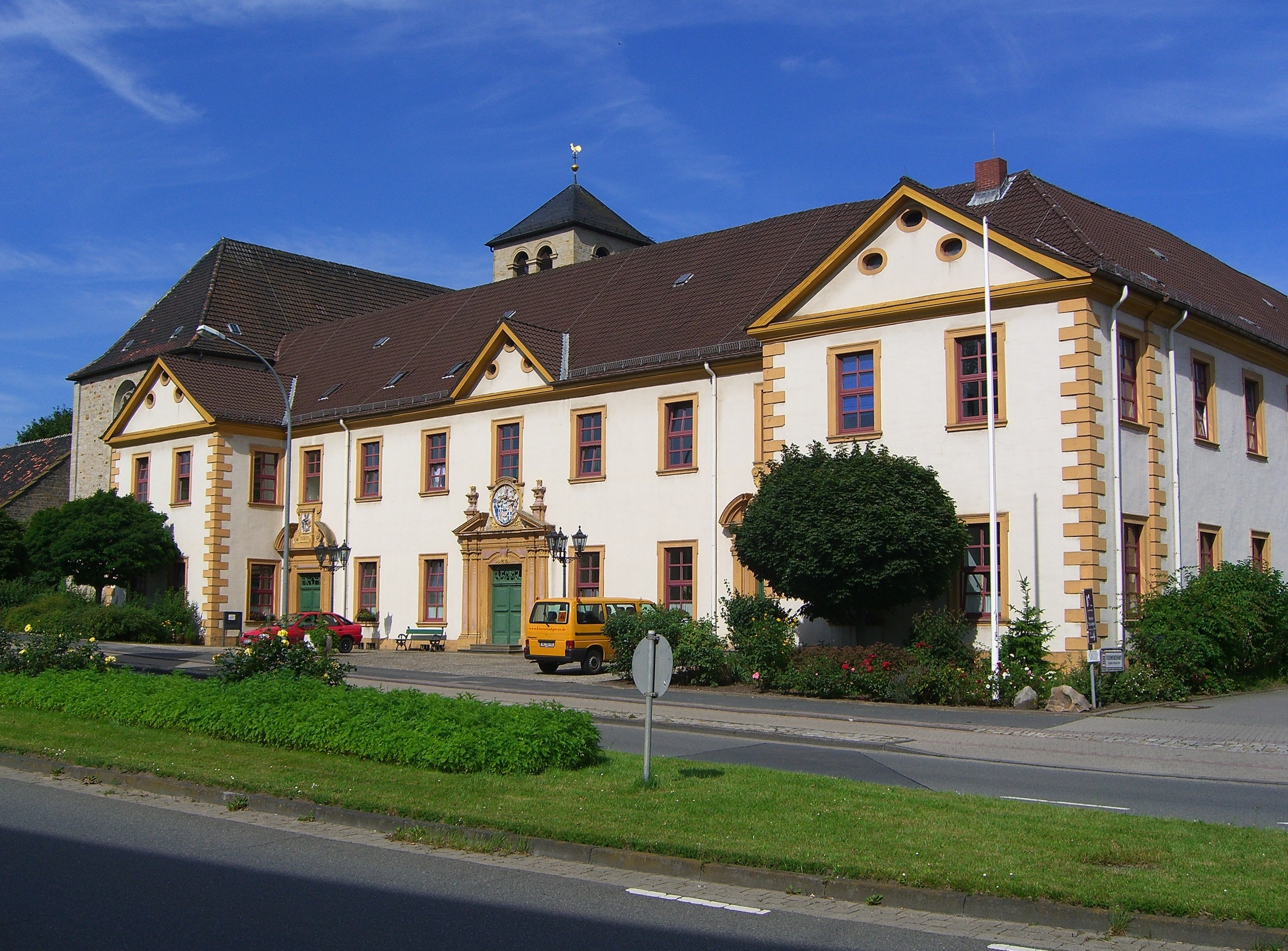
- Interactive map of St. Ludger's Abbey

Monastery information
- Order: Benedictine
- Established: 800

People
- Founder: Saint Ludger

Site
- Location: Helmstedt, Lower Saxony

St. Ludger's Abbey (German: Kloster St. Ludgeri) was a former monastery of the Benedictine Order in Helmstedt, Lower Saxony, founded by Saint Ludger around 800. Until it was secularised in 1802 it was an Imperial Abbey, with sovereignty over the whole town of Helmstedt until the 15th century.

== History ==
Shortly before 800 the missionary Ludger entered the area of Helmstedt with Charlemagne in order to convert the Saxons. Ludger founded the monastery on an ancient road, the Reichsstrasse, on the site of an ancient German shrine by a holy spring. The monastery's position on this important trade route was extremely advantageous in the Middle Ages, as great financial benefits derived from the constant passage of traders.

The significance of the monastery for Helmstedt is reflected in the town's arms, which depict Saint Ludger. The monastery premises were rebuilt after the Thirty Years' War in the Baroque style; the ornamental monastery gateway (the so-called Turks' Gate) and the dovecote were added in the 18th century. The monastery was secularised during the Napoleonic Wars, in 1802, and the possession of the site passed to the Dukes of Brunswick-Wolfenbüttel, after which it was managed as an agricultural estate. The buildings, including the monastery church, suffered severe damage during World War II, but have been restored. There has been a Catholic school here from at least the 18th century and there has been a kindergarten for several decades.

St. Ludger's was a sister house of Werden Abbey (incorporated into Essen in 1923). The monasteries were managed in tandem, as reflected in the arms of both houses, each of which bears twin abbots' staffs.

== Gallery ==
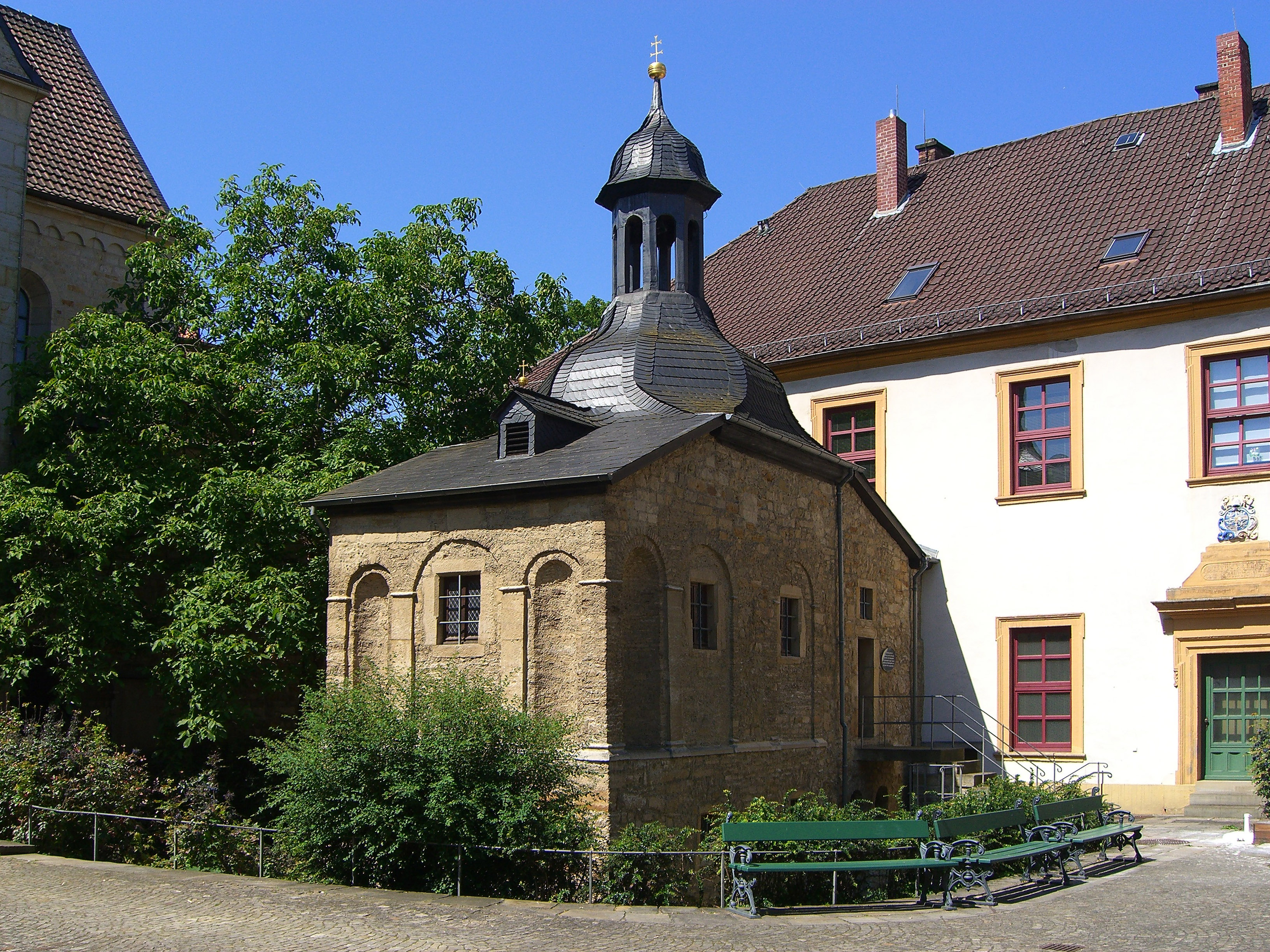
Twin chapel in the courtyard of the abbey. The lower chapel (11th century) is dedicated to Saints Peter and Paul, the upper chapel (17th century) is dedicated to John the Baptist

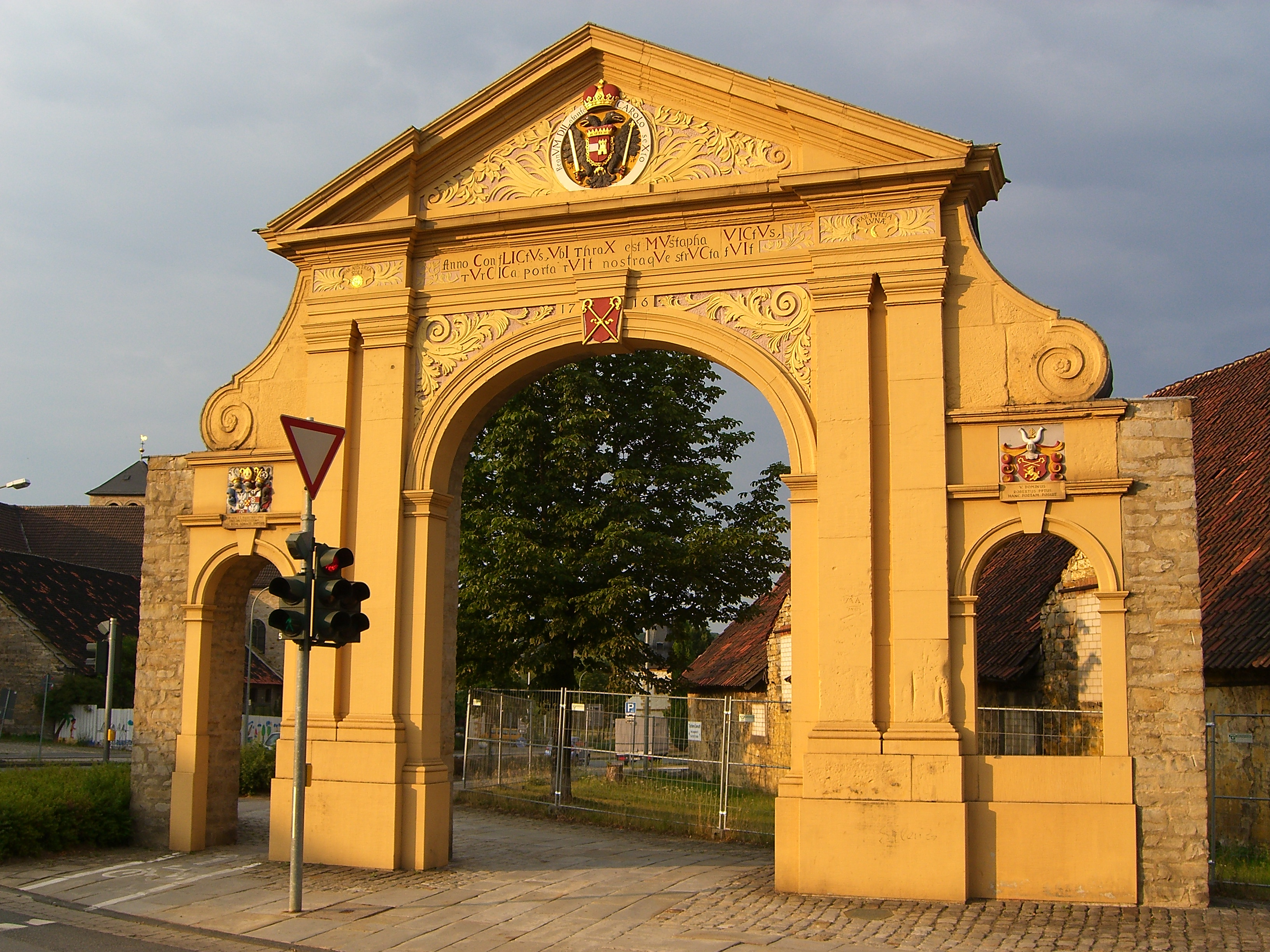
The Türkentor, erected in 1716 to celebrate Austrian victory over the Ottoman Empire at the Battle of Petrovaradin

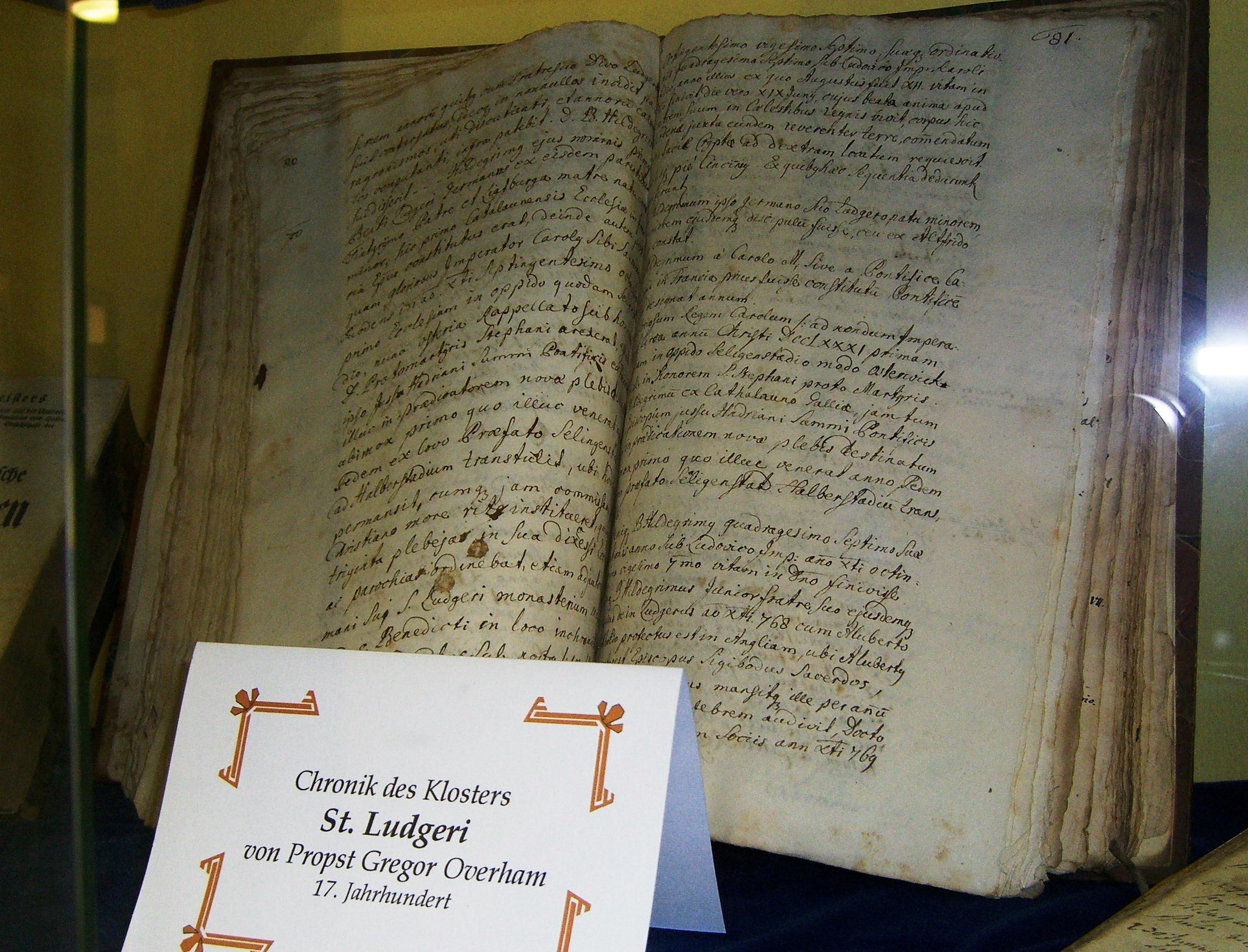
Chronicle of the abbey
