= Wittelsbacher Palais =

Building in Maxvorstadt, Upper Bavaria, Germany

Coordinates: 48.1442°N 11.5722°E

The Wittelsbacher Palais was located in Munich at the northeast corner of the Brienner Strasse and the Türkenstraße. Today, a building of the BayernLB is located at the site of the palace. A copy of one of two stone lions at the entrance area is the only keepsake of the palace.

== History ==
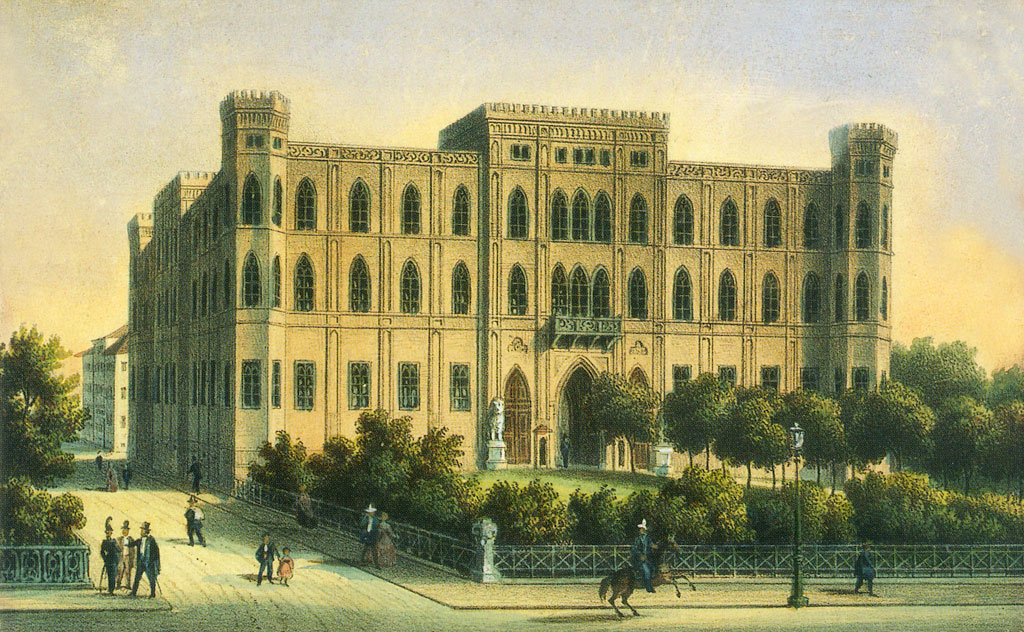
Wittelsbacher Palais

The red brick building, with a Neo Gothic exterior, was built as a royal prince's palace from 1843 to 1848 by Friedrich von Gärtner and Johann Moninger for Crown Prince Maximilian, the later King Maximilian II; After the death of Gärtner the palace was completed by his co-worker Carl Klumpp.

From 1848 to 1868 it was the retirement place of King Ludwig I, 1887 to 1918 it served as residence of Ludwig III. At the beginning of August 1914 at the outbreak of the First World War the monarch spoke from the balcony of the Palais to the population.

In 1919, it was the meeting place of the Aktionskommittee of the Bavarian Soviet Republic. As of October 1933, it was Headquarters of the Gestapo and from 1934/35 a Gestapo prison, in which Sophie Scholl and Hans Scholl were imprisoned on February 18, 1943, until their trial on February 22. During the air raids on Munich, it was heavily damaged in 1944, but only completely torn down in 1964.

The famous lions, known as "Swapo", sculpted by Johann Halbig stood outside the main entrance of the palace. One lion is now a memorial for journalist Fritz Gerlich, who was murdered at the Dachau concentration camp, and is located at Munich Catholic Academy (Katholischen Akademie München).
