= Museum Reich der Kristalle =

Museum in Germany

Coordinates: 48°08′52″N 11°34′22″E

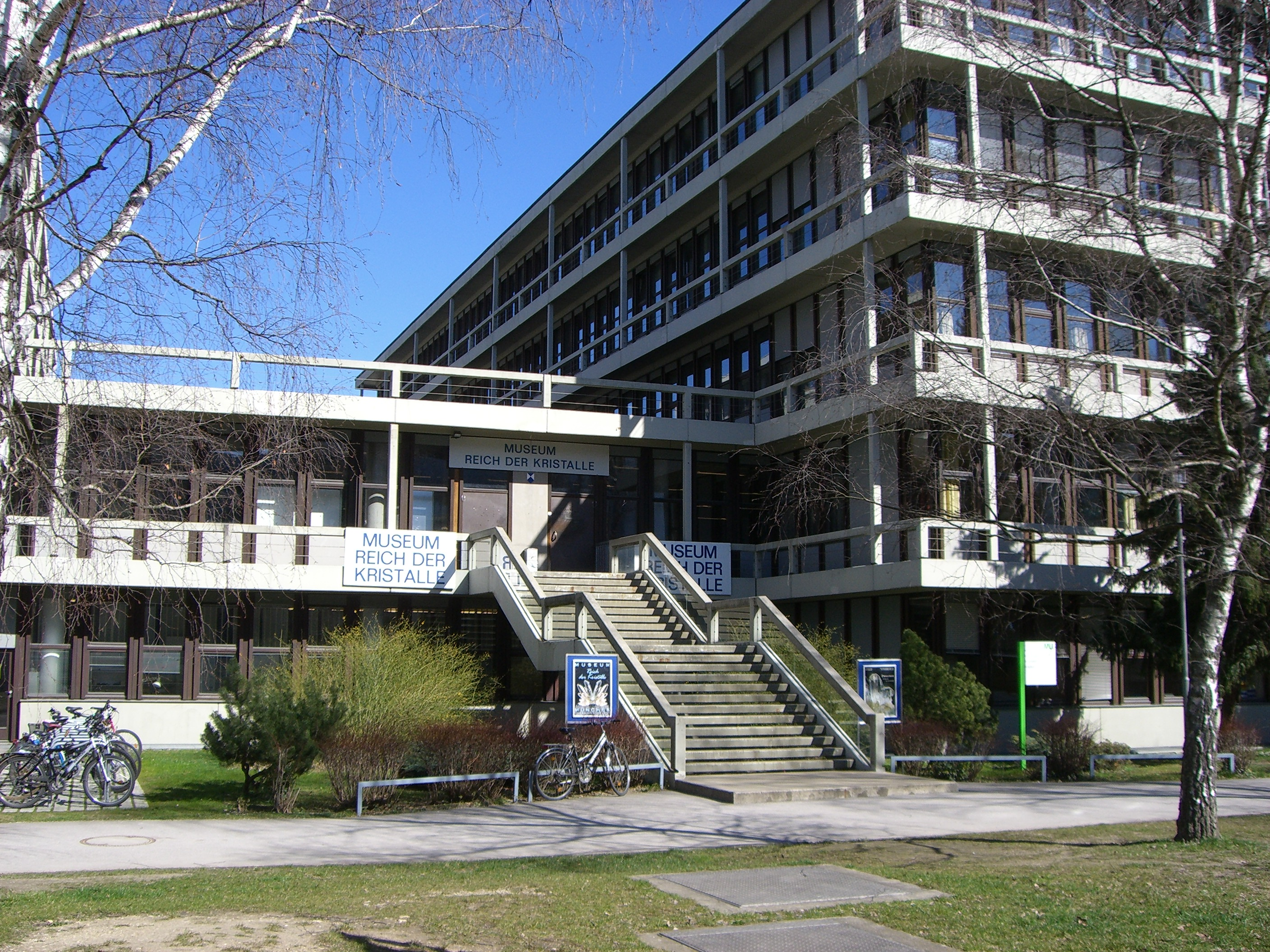
Museum Reich der Kristalle.

The Museum Reich der Kristalle is the publicly accessible part of the Mineralogischen Staatssammlung (State Mineralogical Collection) of Munich, Germany. It features explanations of mineralogical and crystallographic terms using models. It also showcases minerals local to Bavaria. The museum has a few small displays as well as a showroom which hosts special exhibitions.

== Description ==
Part of the Staatliche Naturwissenschaftliche Sammlungen Bayerns, the Museum is part of the arts-complex on the former site of the Türkenkaserne barracks.
