= Türkenkaserne =

Bavarian army barracks in Munich, Germany

Coordinates: 48°08′49″N 11°34′24″E

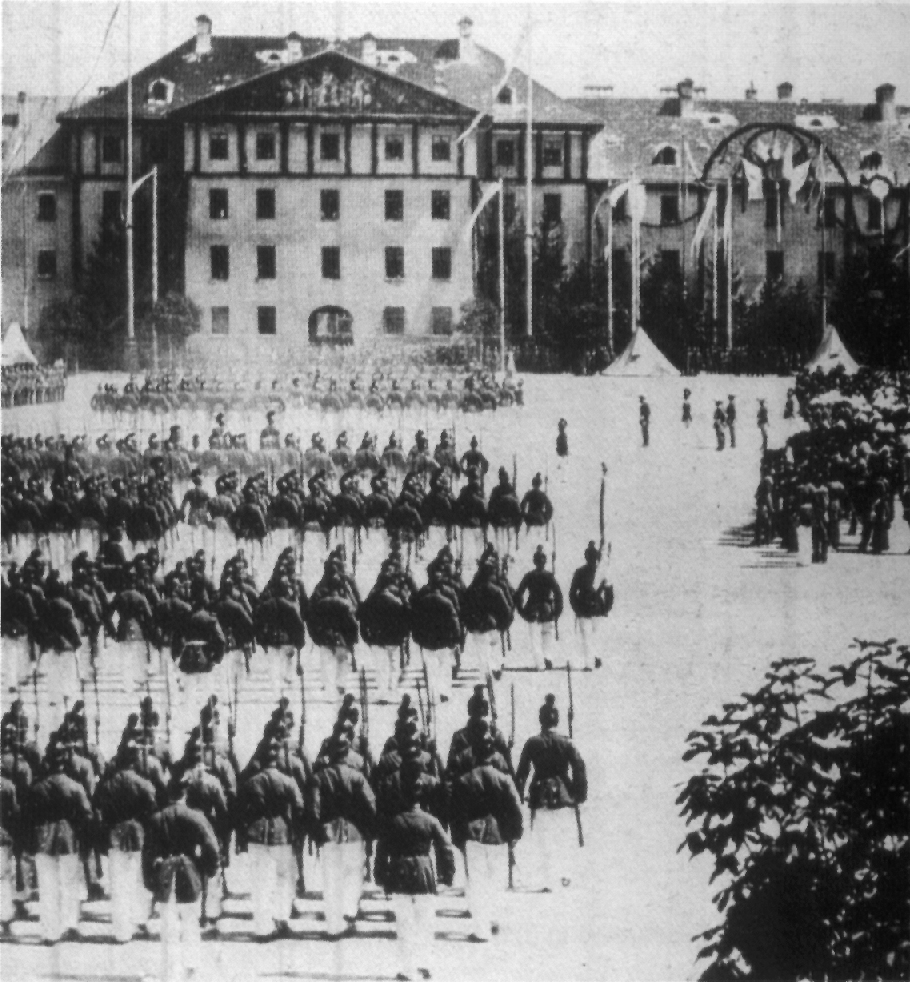
The parade ground of the Türkenkaserne during a parade by the 2nd "Kronprinz" Infantry Regiment in 1882

The Türkenkaserne (or Neue Infanteriekaserne am Türkengraben und Prinz-Arnulf-Kaserne) was a Bavarian Army barracks in the Maxvorstadt district of the German city of Munich.

== History ==
=== 1826 to 1918 ===
The barracks were occupied by the Royal Bavarian Infantry Lifeguards Regiment until 1918, and then by the 2nd "Kronprinz" Line Infantry Regiment. From the 1890s onwards two other regiments were billeted in the new barracks. Another wing was added in 1872–73, followed by an "Exerzierhaus" or gymnasium in 1886. On the 1918 Revolution soldiers closed down the barracks under orders from Kurt Eisner.

=== 1918 and demolition ===
The Bavarian State Police took over the barracks in 1920, but they returned to military use under Nazi rule. Partially destroyed by bombing in the Second World War, they were used in the postwar period for housing and businesses. The complex was later almost completely demolished, leaving only the Türkentor. The Pinakothek der Moderne, Museum Brandhorst and the Mineralogische Staatssammlung now stand on the barracks' former site.
