= Türkentor (Munich) =

Gatehouse in Munich, Germany

Coordinates: 48°08′50″N 11°34′25″E

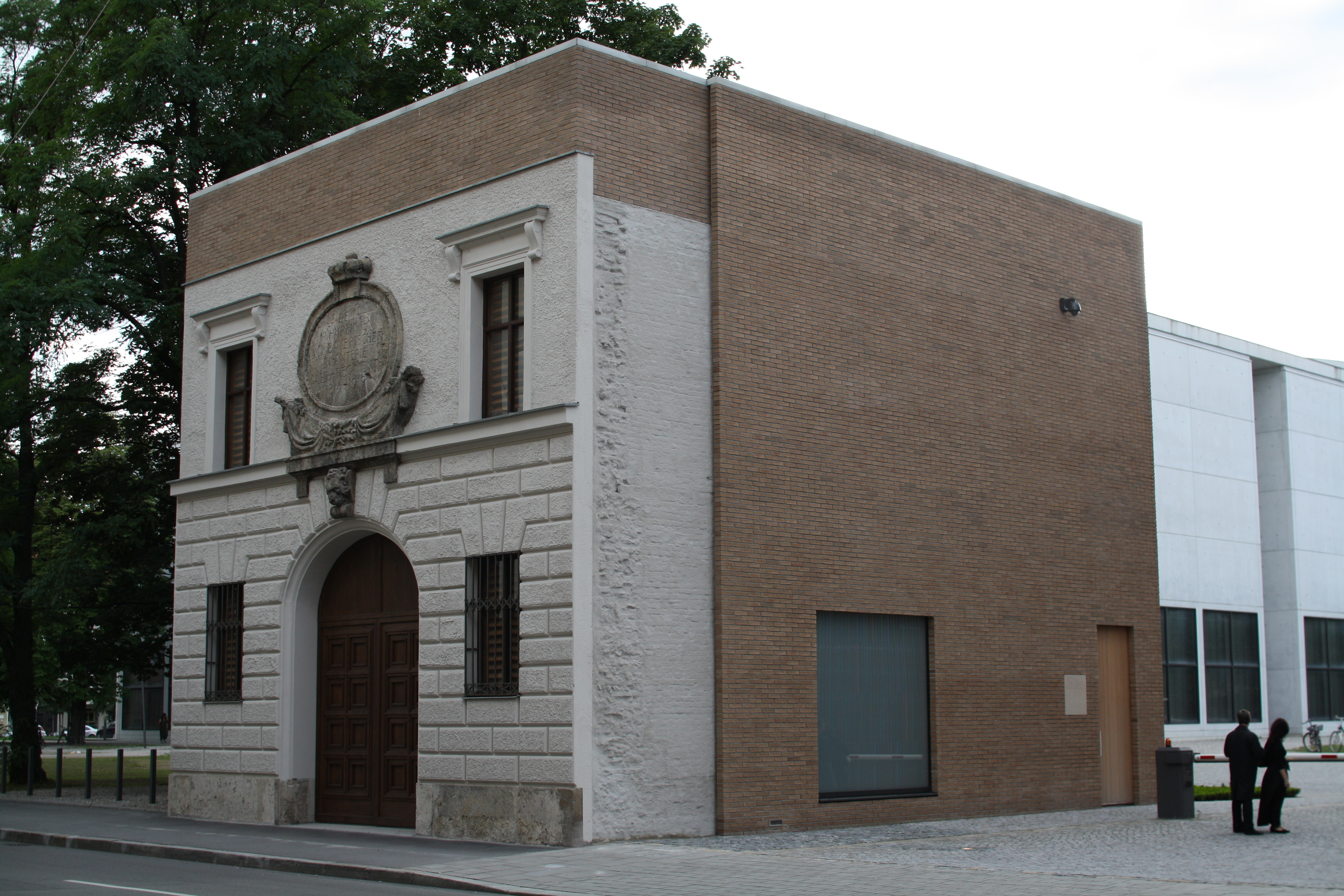
The Türkentor in 2010 after restoration

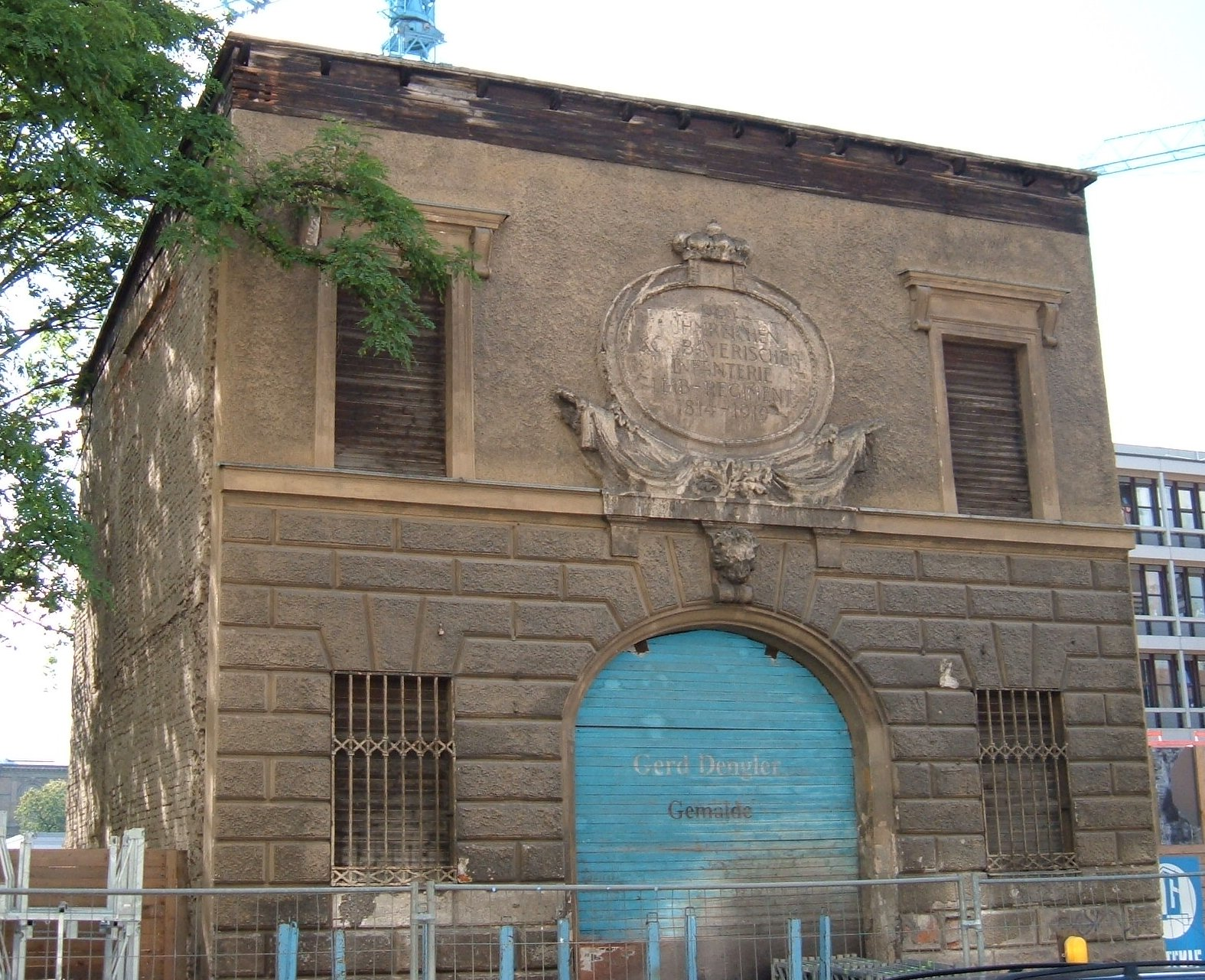
The Türkentor in 2006 before the restoration

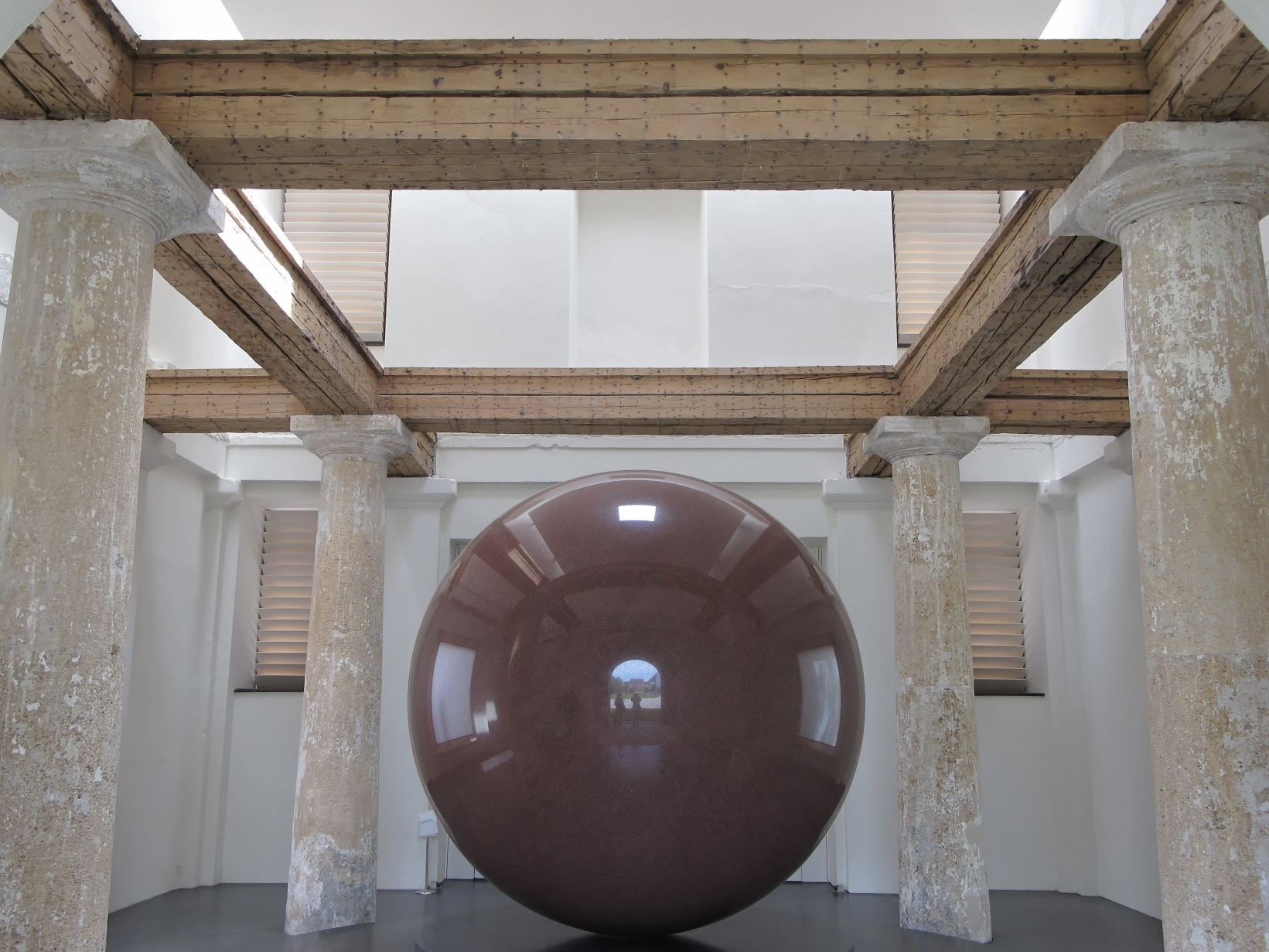
"Large Red Sphere" in the Türkentor

The Türkentor (Turks' Gate) is a gatehouse in Munich. It is the only surviving part of the Türkenkaserne (Turk's barracks), built in 1826 for the Royal Bavarian Infantry Lifeguards Regiment. The barracks and remaining gatehouse were named after the Türkenstraße on which they were located, which was in turn named after the Türkengraben channel dug along the Kurfürstenstraße by Turkish prisoners of war during the German states' 18th century wars with the Ottoman Empire to provide a waterway as part of the Northern Munich Canal System linking the Munich Residenz with the Schleissheim Palace.

Between 2008 and 2010 the Türkentor was restored with 780,000 euro from the Stiftung Pinakothek der Moderne. It reopened in October 2010 and since then has housed the sculpture Large Red Sphere by the American artist Walter De Maria, which had been purchased by the Stiftung Brandhorst.
