= Türkentor (Helmstedt) =

Historic gateway in Helmstedt, Germany

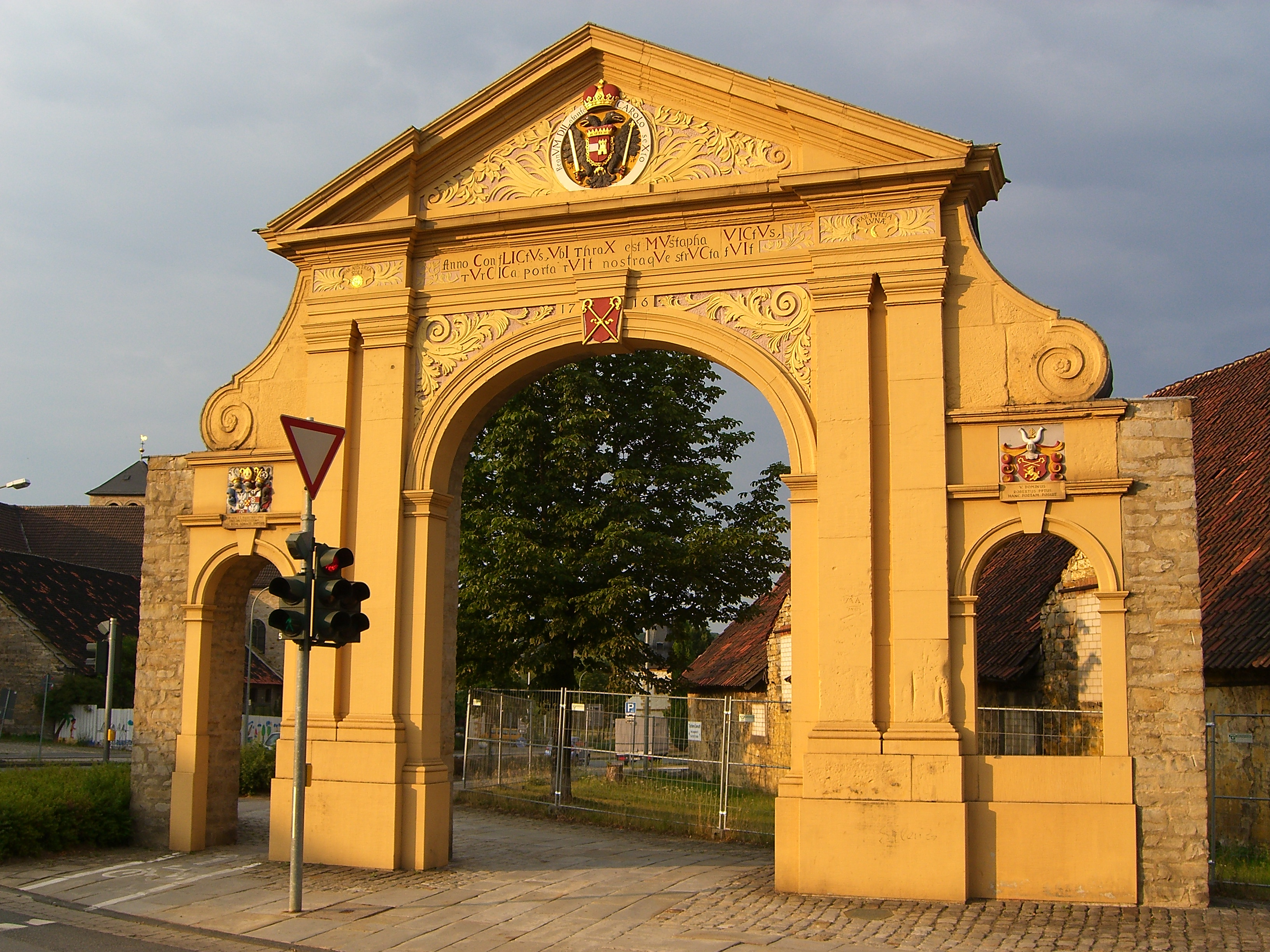
- Türkentor in Helmstedt
- Interactive map of Türkentor
- Location: Helmstedt, Lower Saxony, Germany
- Coordinates: 52°13′30″N 11°00′55″E
- Type: Triumphal arch, gateway
- Beginning date: 1716
- Completion date: 1716
- Restored date: 1986 (resited)
- Dedicated to: Victory over the Ottomans at the Battle of Petrovaradin

The Türkentor (Turks' Gate) is a triumphal arch and gateway in Helmstedt in Lower Saxony in Germany. The main entrance to the former St. Ludger's Abbey and a gateway to the Domänenhof, the arch was built in 1716 to celebrate the victory over the Ottomans by Prince Eugene of Savoy at the Battle of Petrovaradin earlier that year, in which Ferdinand Albert II, Duke of Brunswick-Wolfenbüttel and Johann Matthias von der Schulenburg had also been instrumental. Originally sited in line with the Taubenhaus on what is now Bundesstraße 1, it was severely damaged by bombing in the Second World War and resited to its present location in 1986.

The main pediment bears the arms of the Habsburg emperor and the side-arches bear the arms of the abbey's abbot and prior, who had the arch built in celebration of the victory, of family connections to the House of Brunswick and of links between the abbey and the emperor. The architrave also bears the Roman numerals for the year 1716 and above the double pilasters on either side are a sun (symbol of the Habsburg Empire) and a crescent moon (symbol of the Ottoman Empire).
