= Adalbertstraße =

Street in Maxvorstadt, Munich, Germany

Coordinates: 48.1532°N 11.5751°E

The Adalbertstraße is a street in the Maxvorstadt, the district 3 of the Bavarian capital Munich. The street, which had been paved in 1825, was named in 1829 after Prince Adalbert of Bavaria (1828-1875), the fourth son of Ludwig I of Bavaria. Previously the Adalbertstraße had been called Letzte Straße ("Last Street"), since it formed the northern end of Maxvorstadt.

== Route ==
The Adalbertstraße runs from Ludwigstraße, north of the main building of LMU Munich, westwards to Tengstraße. It crosses at right angles several streets of the geometrically implemented urban expansion. It leads past the 1866-to-1869 Old North Cemetery. At its western end, the Adalbertstraße encounters the Tengstraße, southeast of the Church of St. Joseph.

== Buildings ==
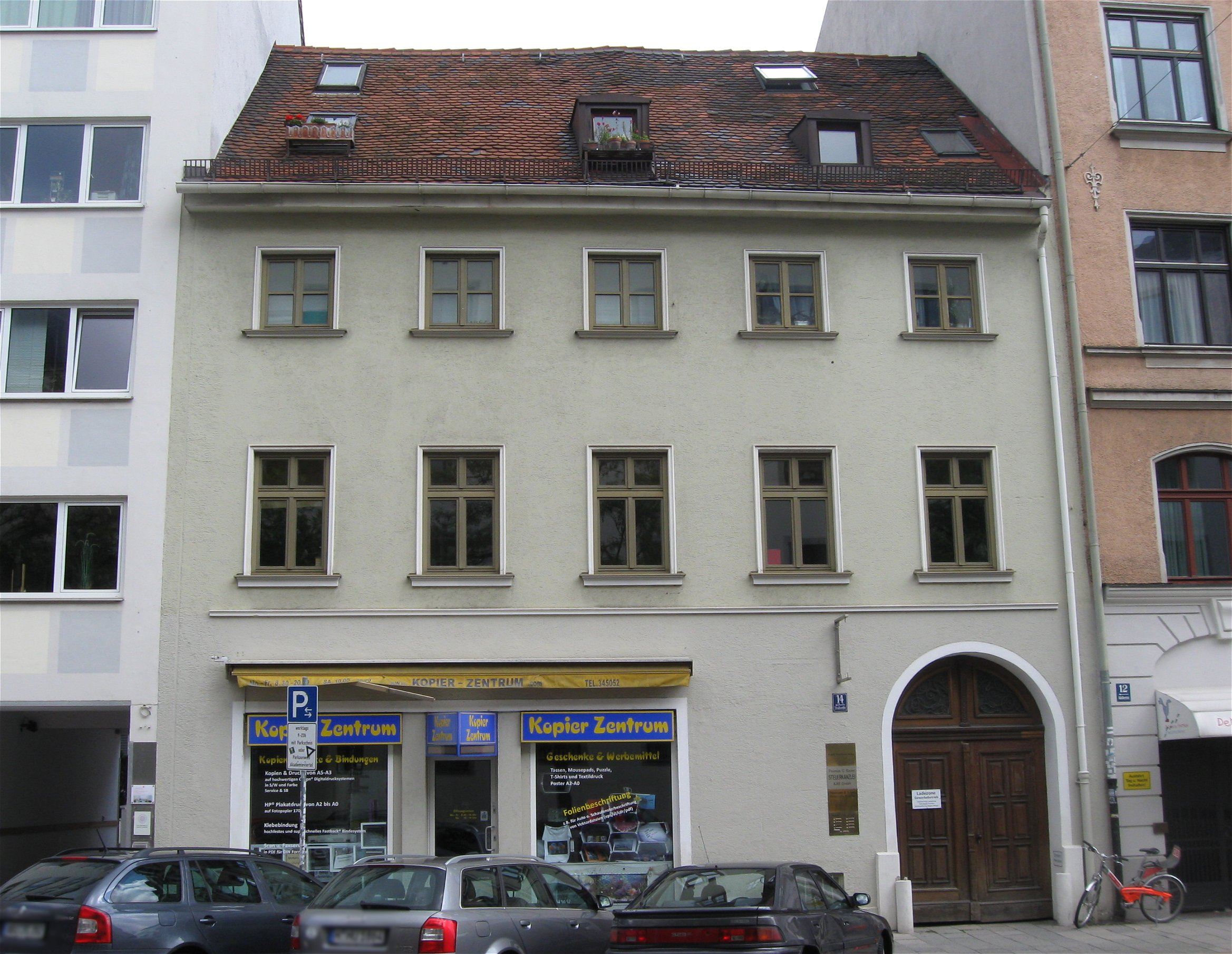
Adalbertstr. 14, the only house from the original development

Due to the damages during the Second World War and other changes, the Adalbertstraße shows a heterogeneous development. From the original two-storey buildings, only the house no. 14 from the period around 1827/30 has been preserved. The original buildings were replaced, starting in the 1860s, by mostly four-storey rental buildings and commercial buildings in the style of the Neo-Renaissance.

== Historical buildings on the Adalbertstraße ==
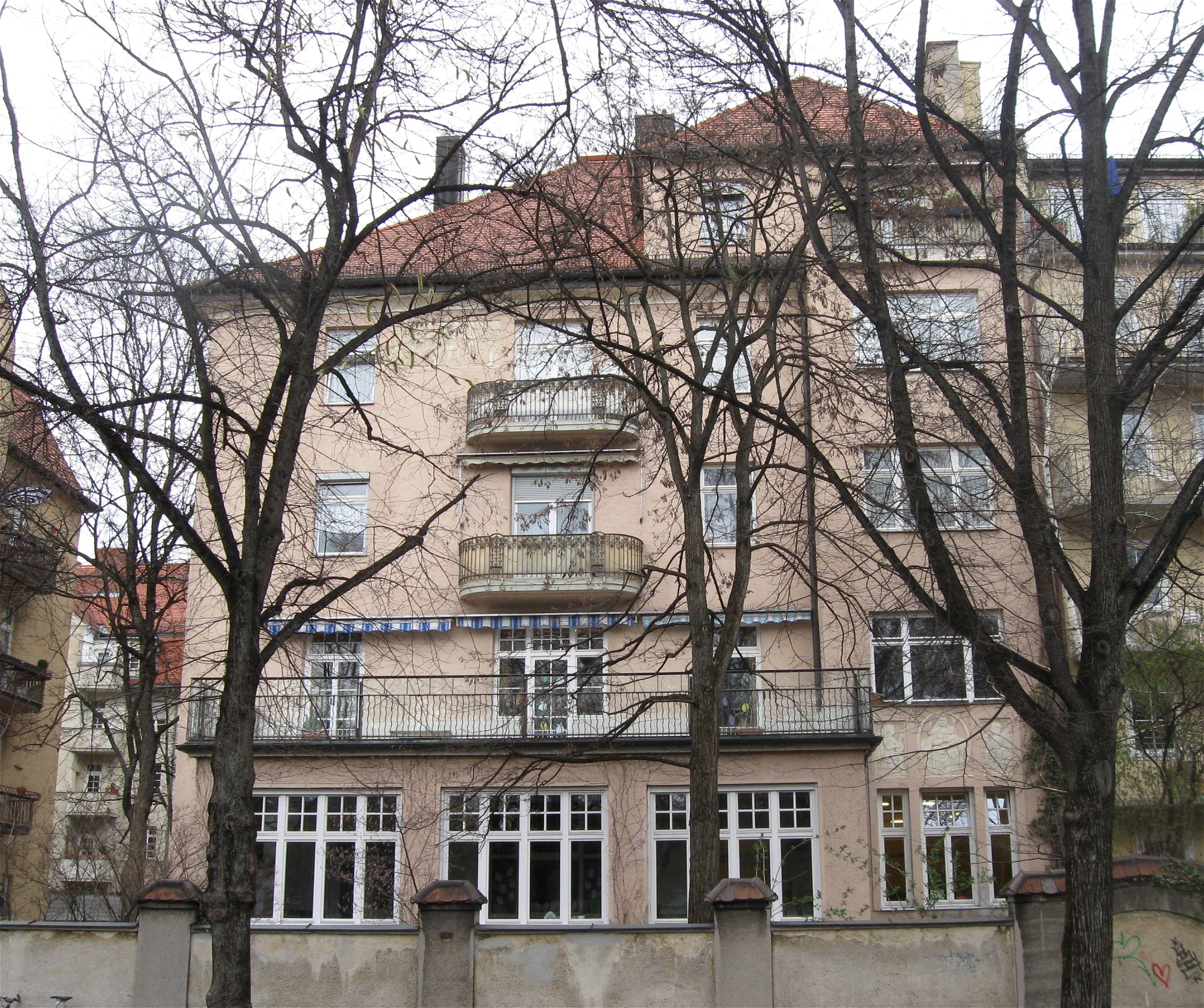
Adalbertstraße 106: Art Nouveau by Paul Liebergesell and Feodor Lehmann (built 1902 to 1904)

- Adalbertstraße 7/9
- Adalbertstraße 12
- Adalbertstraße 14
- Adalbertstraße 31
- Adalbertstraße 49
- Adalbertstraße 51
- Adalbertstraße 53
- Adalbertstraße 62
- Adalbertstraße 64
- Building group Adalbertstraße 70, 72, 76, 78, 80
- Adalbertstraße 90
- Adalbertstraße 96
- Adalbertstraße 98
- Adalbertstraße 100
- Adalbertstraße 106: Former child care Establishment
- Adalbertstraße 108

== Famous residents ==
- Anders Andersen-Lundby, painter, lived in Adalbertstraße 55
- Hermann Euler, painter
- Max Hofmann, resident poet, lived in Adalbertstraße 49
- Petra Nettelbeck, TV announcer
- Ernst Oppler, painter, lived in Adalbertstraße 6
- Gustav Rienäcker, painter, lived in Adalbertstraße 70 a
- Paul Roloff, painter, had a studio in Adalbertstraße 55
- Joseph Rosenthal, antiquarian, lived in Adalbertstraße 2c
- Otto Strützel, painter
- Karl Wolf, painter, grew up in the Adalbertstraße
