= Brienner Straße (Munich) =

Royal avenue in Munich, Bavaria

Coordinates: 48.145°N 11.568°E

The neoclassical Brienner Straße in Munich is one of four royal avenues next to the Ludwigstraße, the Maximilianstraße and the Prinzregentenstraße. The boulevard was constructed from 1812 onwards, during the reigns of Maximilian I Joseph of Bavaria and his successor Ludwig I, in accordance with a plan by Karl von Fischer and Friedrich Ludwig von Sckell. The avenue is named after the Battle of Brienne.

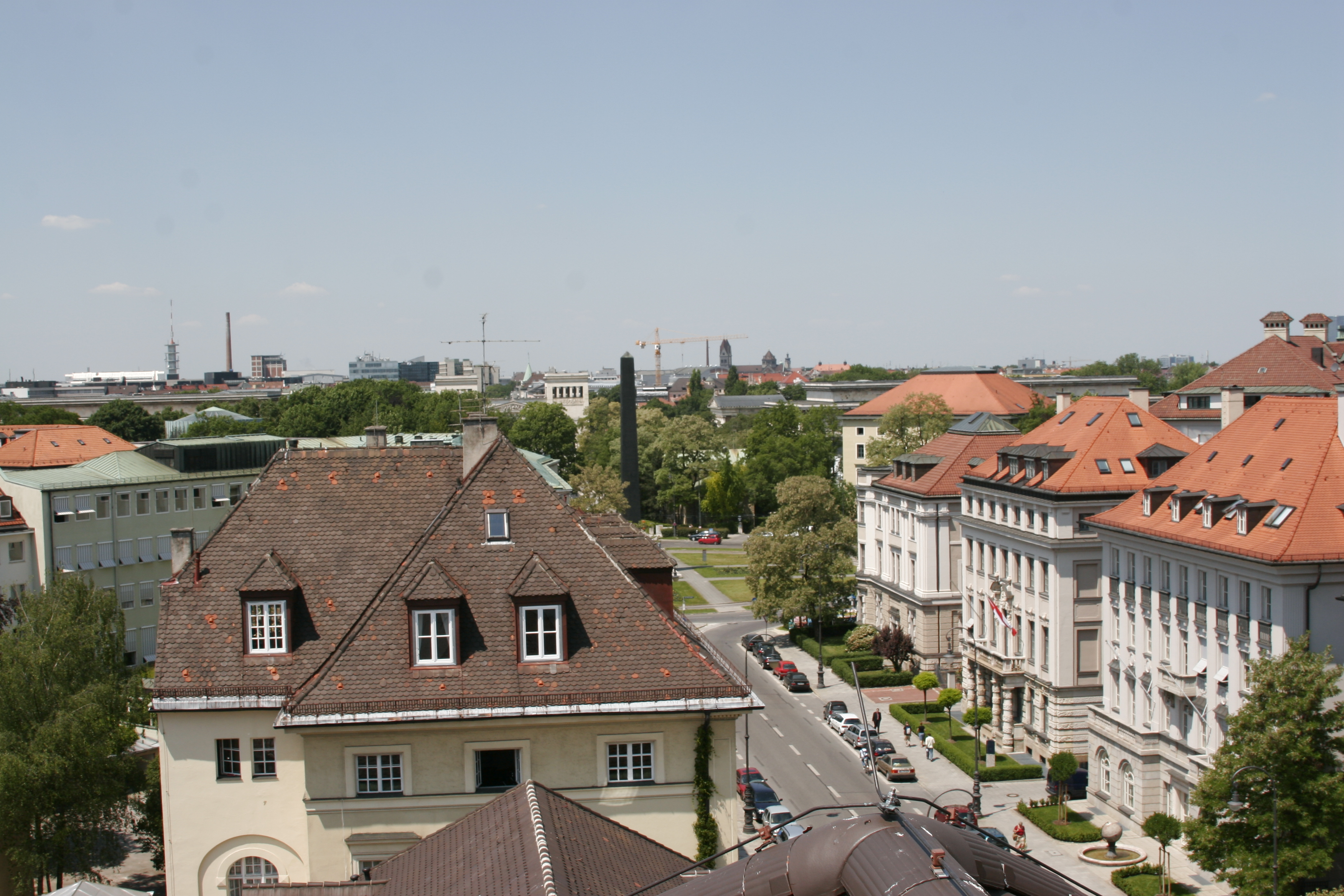
Brienner Strasse, view to Karolinenplatz

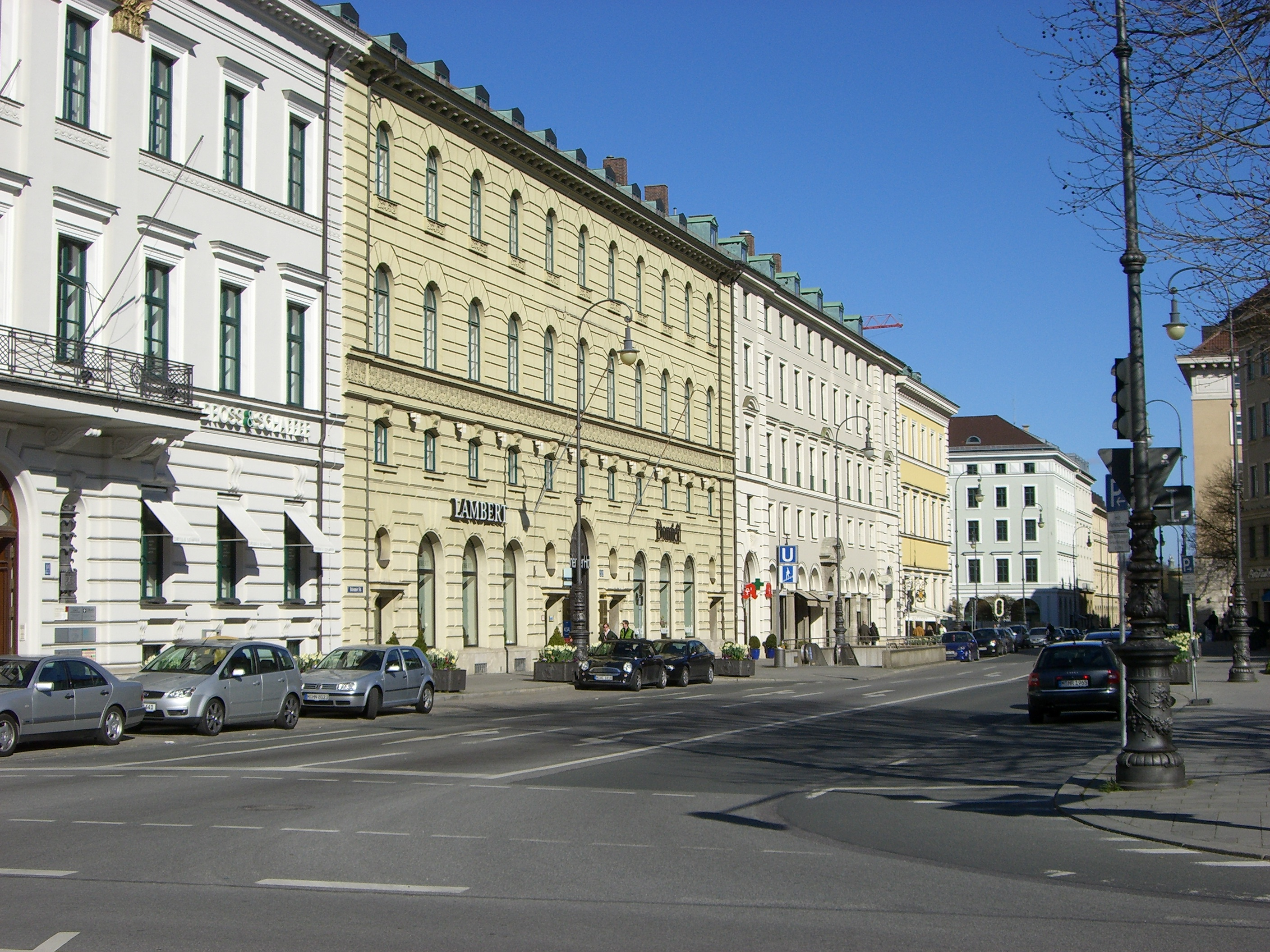
Brienner Strasse, some mansions at the eastern part

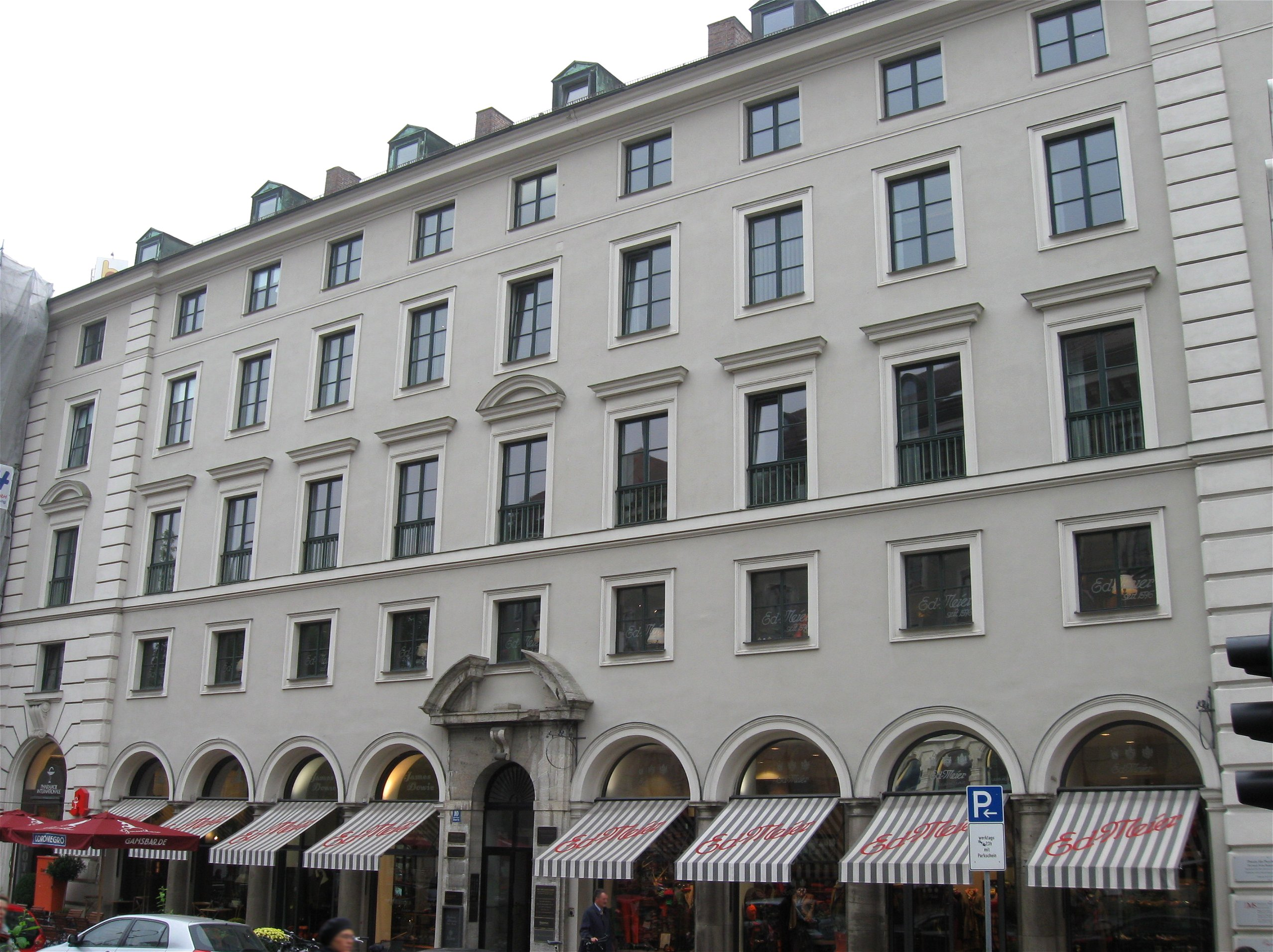
Palais Arco at Brienner Strasse 10

== Architecture ==
The Brienner Straße starts at Odeonsplatz on the northern fringe of the Old Town close to the Residenz, and runs from east to west passing Wittelsbacher Platz and the circular Karolinenplatz and finally opens into the impressive Königsplatz, designed with the "Doric" Propylaea, the "Ionic" Glyptothek and the "Corinthian" State Museum of Classical Art, behind which St. Boniface's Abbey was erected. In the westernmost part of the Brienner Straße, between Königsplatz and Stiglmeierplatz, the Munich Volkstheater (People's Theatre) was founded in 1983.

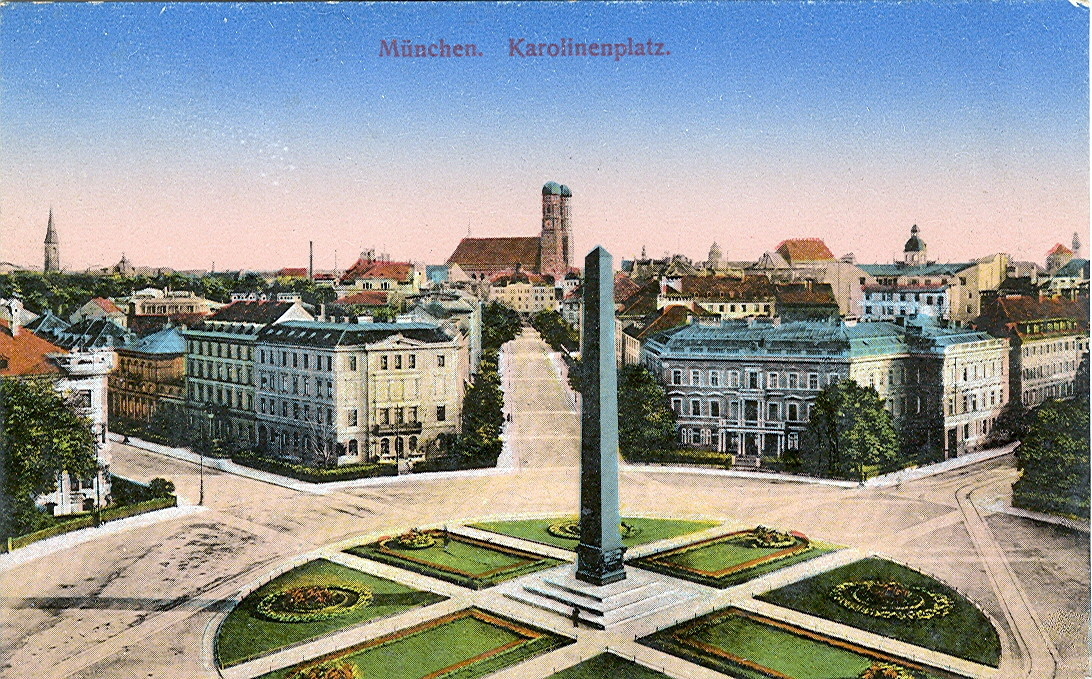
Karolinenplatz, 1914

The area around Königsplatz is home to the Kunstareal, Munich's gallery and museum quarter, also including the Alte Pinakothek, the Neue Pinakothek, the Pinakothek der Moderne and the Lenbachhaus.

The Obelisk at Karolinenplatz was built in 1833 by Leo von Klenze as a memorial for the 30,000 Bavarian soldiers who lost their lives during the French invasion of Russia. The monument is 29 meters high and constructed out of bronze plates over brick. The metal was obtained from guns of the Turkish battle-ships sunk in the Battle of Navarino on October 20, 1827. The purpose of the Amerika Haus at 3 Karolinenplatz is to focus on culture as a center for cultural exchange between Bavaria and the United States. The Börse München is also situated at Karolinenplatz.

The Wittelsbacherplatz with its ensemble of Neo-Classical buildings was designed by Leo von Klenze. The square is bounded on the north side by the Palais Ludwig Ferdinand, built in 1825–26 as a home for von Klenze himself but later acquired by Prince Ludwig Ferdinand of Bavaria. The mansion serves today as the head office of the Siemens Corporation. On the west side stands the Palais Arco-Zinneberg (1820), which was also badly damaged in the last war. The former concert hall Odeon, present home of the Bavarian Ministry of the Interior, bounds the square on its northeast side.

Most of the avenue's mansions were also erected in strict Neo-Classical style, such as the Almeida Palais (by Jean Baptist Métivier, 1824). Several buildings were destroyed during World War II. The opening in the middle of the Brienner Strasse for the new circular road Altstadtring after World War II severely disturbs the ensemble.

== Brienner Straße during the Third Reich ==
As a beautiful and monumental place, the Königplatz was used during the Third Reich as a square for the Nazi Party's mass rallies and two "Honor Temples" (Ehrentempel) were erected at the east side. The Brown House, the national headquarters of the Nazi Party (Nationalsozialistische Deutsche Arbeiterpartei) in Germany was located at 45 Brienner Straße. The former Wittelsbacher Palais nearby served as headquarter for the Gestapo.

In December 2005 the government of Bavaria announced that the site would soon become the home of the future NS-Dokumentationszentrum (Documentation Centre for the History of National Socialism). In March 2009, Munich Mayor Christian Ude announced that a team of architects from Berlin had won a competition to design the new Third Reich documentation center. Construction on the cube-like structure began during the spring of 2011 and the building opened in 2015.
