= Türkengraben =

Canal in Maxvorstadt, Bavaria, Germany

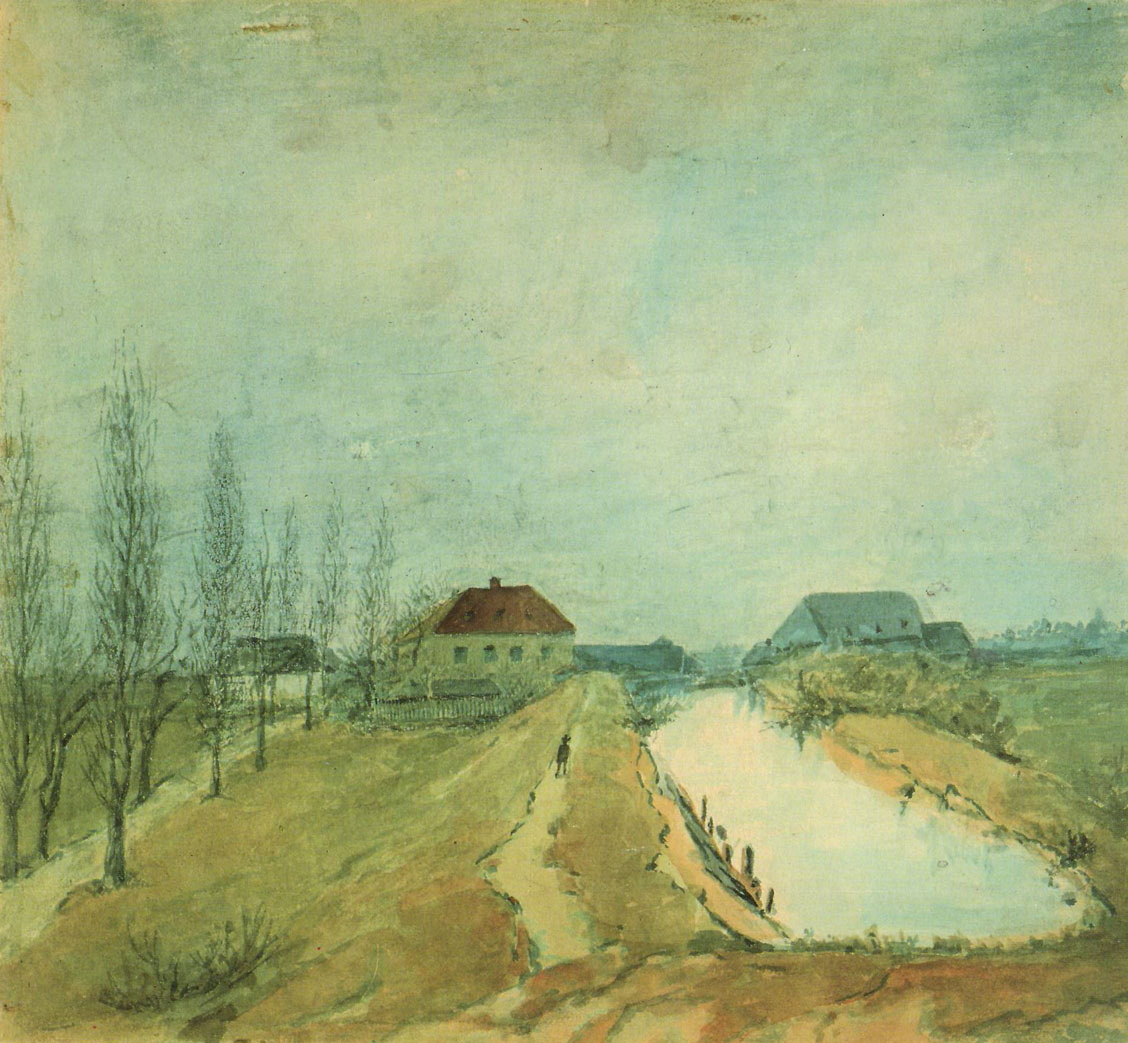
Türkengraben

Türkengraben is located in Maxvorstadt, Munich, Bavaria, Germany.
