= History of Munich =

Historical affiliations

Holy Roman Empire (1158–1806)

Duchy of Bavaria (1158–1180)
Bishops of Freising (1180–1240)
Duchy of Bavaria (1240–1255)
Duchy of Upper Bavaria (1255–1340)
Duchy of Bavaria (1340–1349)
Duchy of Upper Bavaria (1349–1363)
Duchy of Bavaria-Landshut (1363–1392)
Duchy of Bavaria-Munich (1392–1505)
Duchy of Bavaria (1505–1623)
Electorate of Bavaria (1623–1806)

Kingdom of Bavaria (1806–1918)
German Empire (1871–1918)
Weimar Republic (1918–1933)
Nazi Germany (1933–1945)
Allied-occupied Germany (1945–1949)
Federal Republic of Germany (1949–present)

The history of Munich dates back to 1158, when Henry the Lion established a market near a bridge over the Isar, marking the origin of the city. In 1255, it became the residence of the House of Wittelsbach and later the capital of Bavaria, gaining political and economic importance within the Holy Roman Empire.

During the 16th and 17th centuries, Munich developed as a centre of the Counter-Reformation and saw significant architectural and cultural growth under rulers such as William V and Maximilian I. In the 19th century, under King Ludwig I of Bavaria, the city underwent extensive urban expansion and became a hub for the arts, architecture, and science, contributing to its reputation as a cultural capital.

After World War I, Munich was the site of political unrest, including the short-lived Bavarian Soviet Republic and the rise of the Nazi Party, highlighted by events such as the Beer Hall Putsch of 1923. Following heavy destruction in World War II, Munich was rebuilt and emerged as a major economic and cultural centre in West Germany and later reunified Germany.

== Early history ==
The river Isar was a prehistoric trade route and in the Bronze Age Munich was among the largest raft ports in Europe. Bronze Age settlements up to four millennia old have been discovered. Evidence of Celtic settlements from the Iron Age have been discovered in areas around Ramersdorf-Perlach.

The ancient Roman road Via Julia, which connected Augsburg and Salzburg, crossed over the Isar south of Munich, at the towns of Baierbrunn and Gauting. A Roman settlement north-east of Munich was excavated in the neighborhood of Denning.

Starting in the 6th century, the Baiuvarii populated the area around what is now modern Munich, such as in Johanneskirchen, Feldmoching, Bogenhausen and Pasing. The first known Christian church was built ca. 815 in Fröttmanning.

== Origin ==
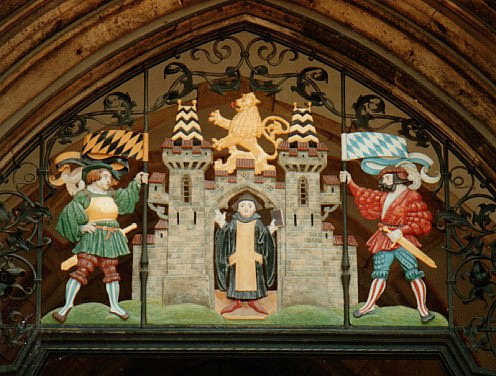
Munich city coat-of-arms

The first medieval bridges across the river Isar were located in current city areas of Munich and Landshut. Henry the Lion, the Duke of Saxony and Bavaria, founded the town of Munich in his territory to control the salt trade, after having burned down the town of Föhring and its bridges over the Isar. Historians date this event at about 1158. The layout of Munich city, with five city gates and market place, resembled that of Höxter.

Henry built a new toll bridge, customs house and a coin market closer to his home, somewhat upstream, at a settlement around the area of modern old town Munich. This new toll bridge most likely crossed the Isar where the Museuminsel and the modern Ludwigsbrücke are now located.

Otto of Freising protested to his nephew, Emperor Frederick Barbarossa. However, on 14 June 1158, in Augsburg, the conflict was settled in favor of Duke Henry. The Augsburg Arbitration mentions the name of the location in dispute as forum apud Munichen. Although Bishop Otto had lost his bridge, the arbiters ordered Duke Henry to pay a third of his income to the Bishop in Freising as compensation.

14 June 1158 is considered the official founding day of the city of Munich. Archaeological excavations at Marienhof Square (near Marienplatz) in advance of the expansion of the S-Bahn (subway) in 2012 discovered shards of vessels from the 11th century, which prove again that the settlement of Munich must be older than the Augsburg Arbitration of 1158. The old St. Peter's Church near Marienplatz is also believed to predate the founding date of the town.

== Middle Ages ==
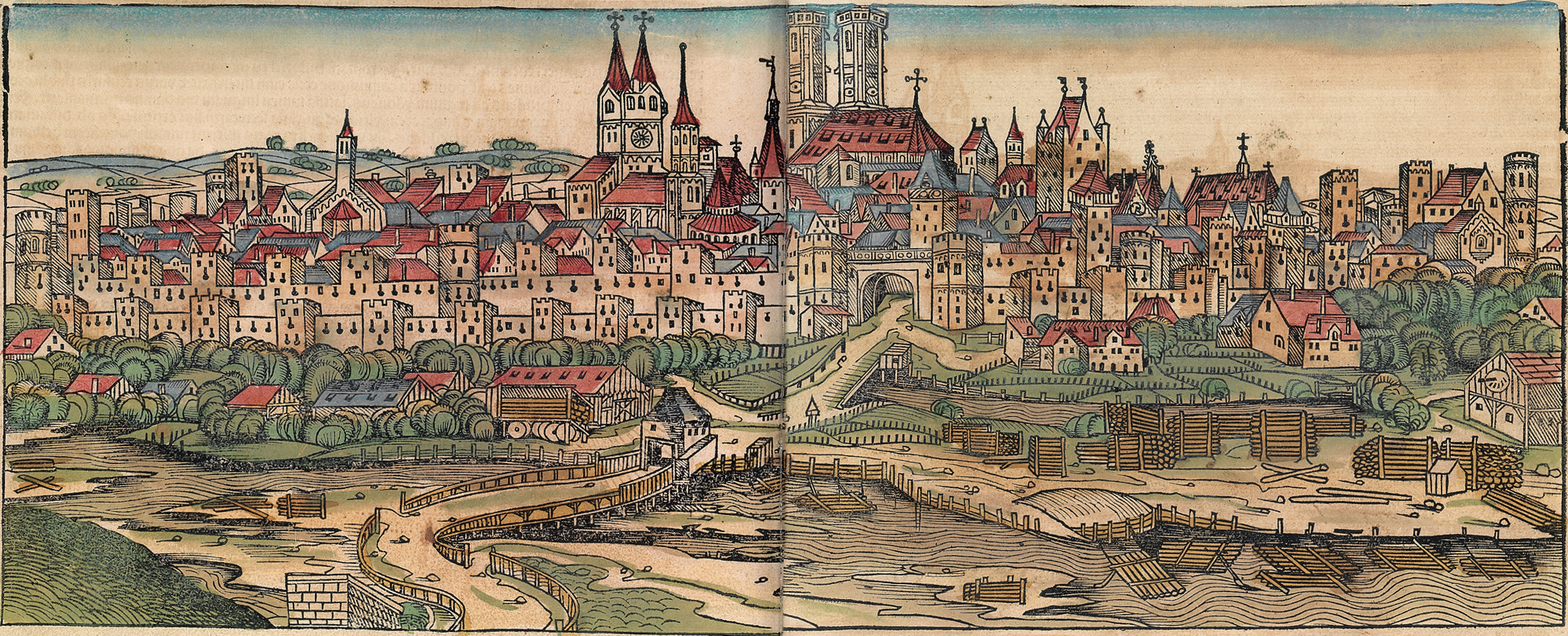
Munich in a 1493 woodcut from Hartmann Schedel's Nuremberg Chronicle

Almost two decades later in 1175 Munich was officially granted city status and received fortification. In 1180, with the trial of Henry the Lion, Otto I Wittelsbach became Duke of Bavaria and Munich was handed over to the bishop of Freising. Otto's heirs, the Wittelsbach dynasty would rule Bavaria until 1918. In 1240 Munich itself was transferred to Otto II Wittelsbach and in 1255, when the dukedom of Bavaria was split in two, Munich became the ducal residence of Upper Bavaria.

Duke Louis IV was elected German king in 1314 and crowned as Holy Roman Emperor in 1328. He strengthened the city's position by granting it the salt monopoly, thus assuring it of additional income. After outmaneuvering Freising, Munich was the principal river crossing on the route from Salzburg to Augsburg. Salzburg (vicinity) was the source of salt, and Augsburg was, at the time, a much more important city than Munich.

The growth of Munich was aided by its location on a gravel plain, where the Isar branched into multiple streams that in turn provided drinking water, defensive advantages, and power for many mills and industries within the city.

On 13 February 1327, a large fire broke out in Munich that lasted two days and destroyed about a third of the town. Munich was rebuilt, extended and protected with a new fortification some years later. In 1349, the Black Death ravaged Munich and Bavaria. Philosophers like Michael of Cesena, Marsilius of Padua and William of Ockham supported Louis IV in his fight with the papacy and were protected at the emperor's court. After the citizenry revolted several times against the dukes, a new castle was built close to the fortification, starting in 1385. An uprising of the guilds in 1397 was suppressed in 1403.

Another devastating fire destroyed parts of the city in 1429. Since the town fathers considered themselves threatened by the Hussites, the fortification was extended. In the late 15th century Munich underwent a revival of gothic arts—the Old Town Hall was enlarged, and a new cathedral—the Frauenkirche—constructed within only twenty years, starting in 1468. The cathedral has become a symbol for the city with its two brick towers and onion domes.

== Capital of the reunited duchy of Bavaria ==
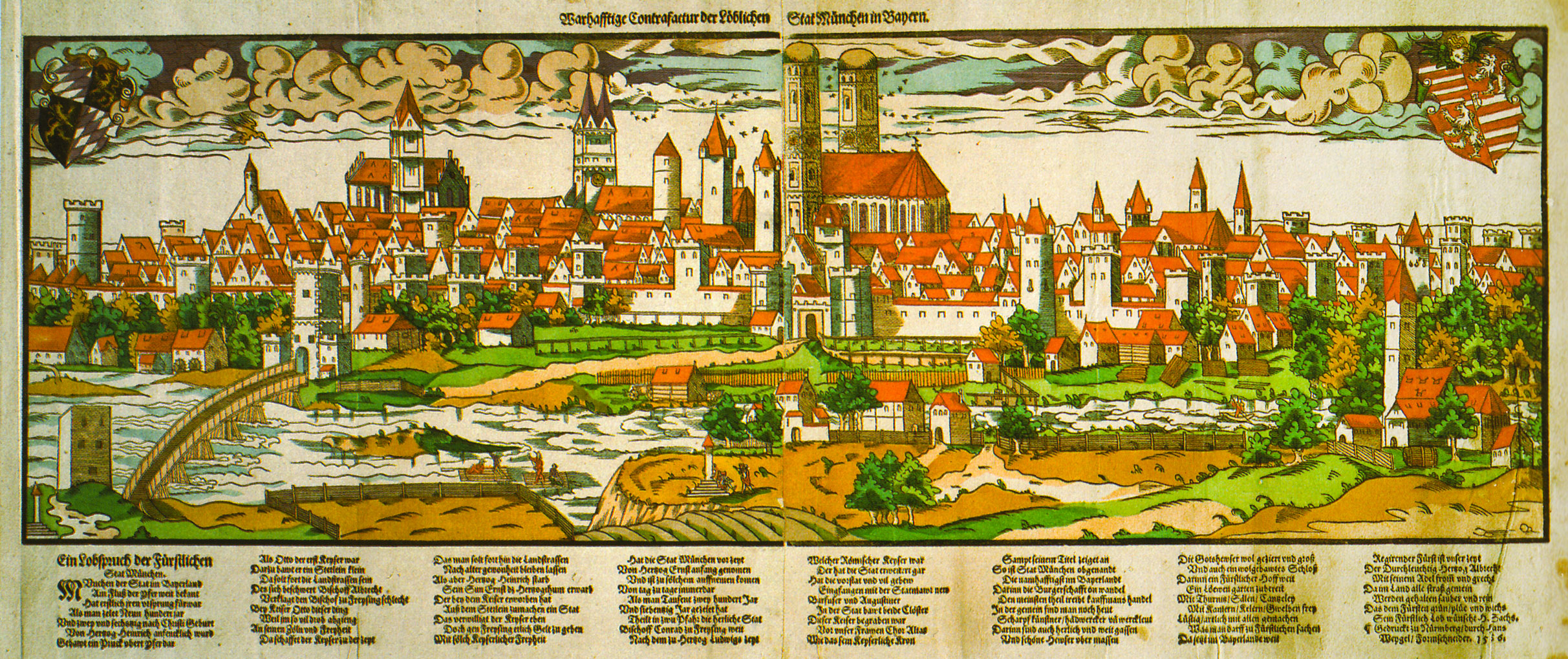
Munich about 1572

After the extinction of the Landshut line of the House of Wittelsbach in 1503, the Landshut War of Succession broke out over its inheritance. It was resolved in 1505 by Emperor Maximilian I, Holy Roman Emperor with the "Cologne arbitration", which reunited the Bavarian duchies into a single Duchy of Bavaria with Munich as its capital. The arts and politics became increasingly influenced by the court. During the 16th century Munich was a centre of the German Counter-Reformation.

The Renaissance movement beset Munich and the Bavarian branch of the House of Wittelsbach under Duke Albrecht V who bolstered their prestige by conjuring up a lineage that reached back to classical antiquity. In 1568 Albrecht V built the Antiquarium to house the Wittelsbach collection of Greek and Roman antiquities in the Munich Residenz. Albrecht V appointed the composer Orlando di Lasso as director of the court orchestra and tempted numerous Italian musicians to work at the Munich court, establishing Munich as a hub for late Renaissance music. During the rule of Duke William V Munich began to be called the "German Rome" and William V began presenting Emperor Charlemagne as ancestor of the Wittelsbach dynasty.

Duke William V further cemented the Wittelsbach rule by commissioning the Jesuit Michaelskirche. He had the sermons of his Jesuit court preacher Jeremias Drexel translated from Latin into German and published them to a greater audience. William V was addressed with the epithet "the Pious" and like his contemporary Wittelsbach dukes promoted himself as "father of the land" (Landesvater), encouraged pilgrimages and Marian devotions. William V had the Hofbräuhaus built in 1589. It would become the prototype for beer halls across Munich.

The Catholic League was founded in Munich in 1609. In 1623, during the Thirty Years' War (1618–1648), Munich became an electoral residence when Duke Maximilian I was invested with the electoral dignity, but in 1632 the city was occupied by King Gustavus Adolphus of Sweden. In 1634 Swedish and Spanish troops advanced on Munich. Maximilian I published a plague ordinance to halt an epidemic escalation. The bubonic plague nevertheless ravaged Munich and the surrounding countryside in 1634 and 1635. During the Thirty Years' War (1618–1648) troops again converged on Munich in 1647 and precautions were taken, so as to avoid another epidemic.

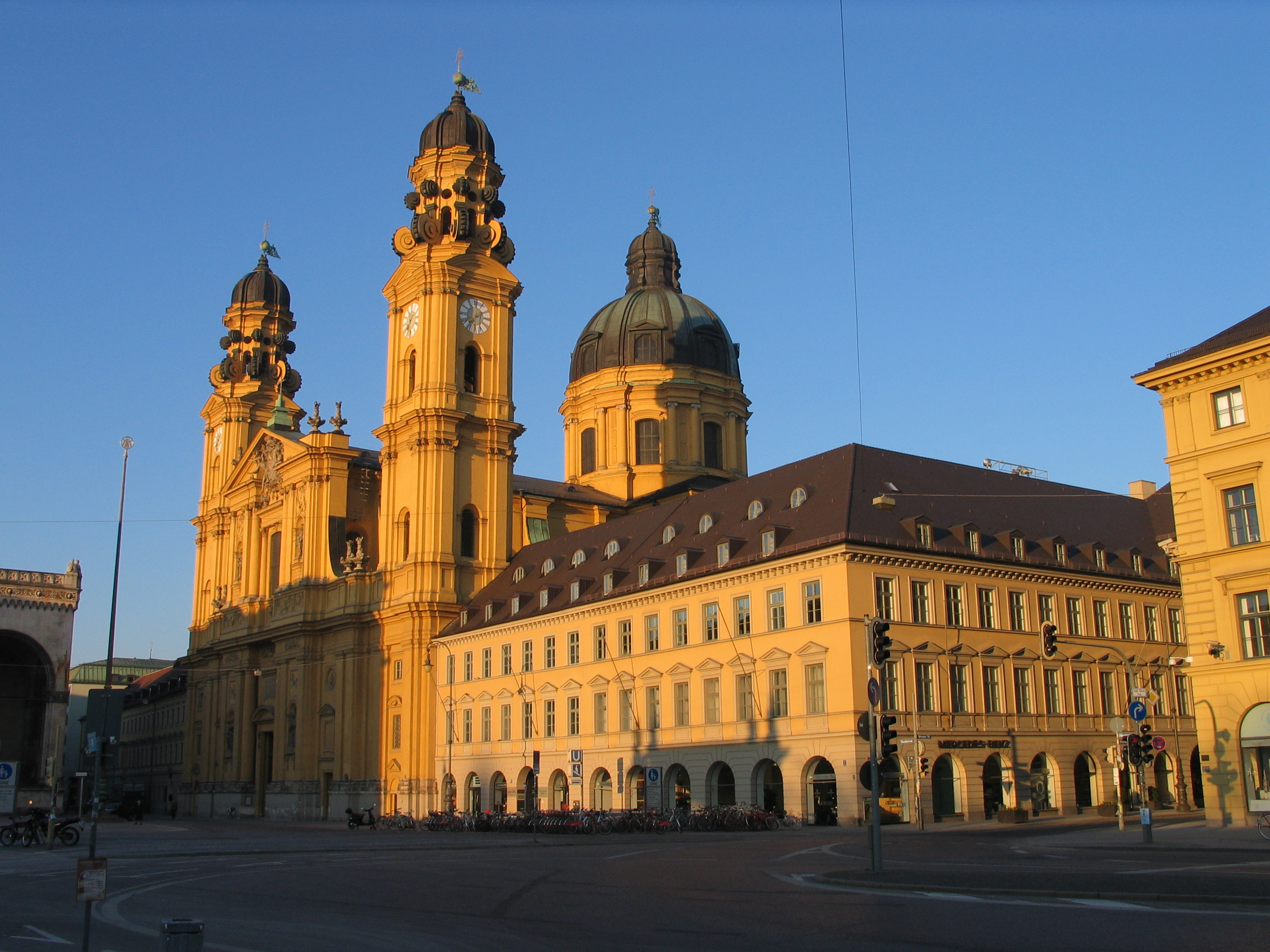
The baroque Theatinerkirche on Odeonsplatz in the historic city centre

After the war Munich quickly became a center of baroque life. Elector Ferdinand Maria's consort Henriette Adelaide of Savoy invited numerous Italian architects and artists to the city, and built the Theatinerkirche and Nymphenburg palace on the occasion of the birth of their son and heir Maximilian II Emanuel, elector of Bavaria.

Munich was under the control of the Habsburg family for some years after Maximilian II Emanuel had made a pact with France in 1705 during the War of the Spanish Succession. The occupation led to bloody uprisings against the Austrian imperial troops followed by a massacre while farmers were rioting (the "Sendlinger Mordweihnacht" or Sendling's Night of Murder). The coronation of Max Emanuel's son elector Charles Albert as Emperor Charles VII in 1742 led to another Habsburg occupation. For a short time 1744–1745 Munich was the imperial residence again under Charles VII. The city's first academic institution, the Bavarian Academy of Sciences, was founded in 1759 by Maximilian III Joseph, who abandoned his forefather's imperial ambitions and made peace.

In 1777, Karl Theodor inherited the Bavarian lands. In 1785, he invited Count Rumford (Benjamin Thompson) to Munich to implement social reforms, including workhouses for the poor and army restructuring with improved conditions for soldiers. In the 1790s, Munich became the largest German city to remove its fortifications, starting in 1791 under Karl Theodor and Rumford. After 1793, citizens built new structures outside the former city walls. The English Garden was laid out—it is one of the world's largest urban public parks. By that time, the city was growing very quickly and was one of the largest cities in continental Europe.

== Capital of the Kingdom of Bavaria ==
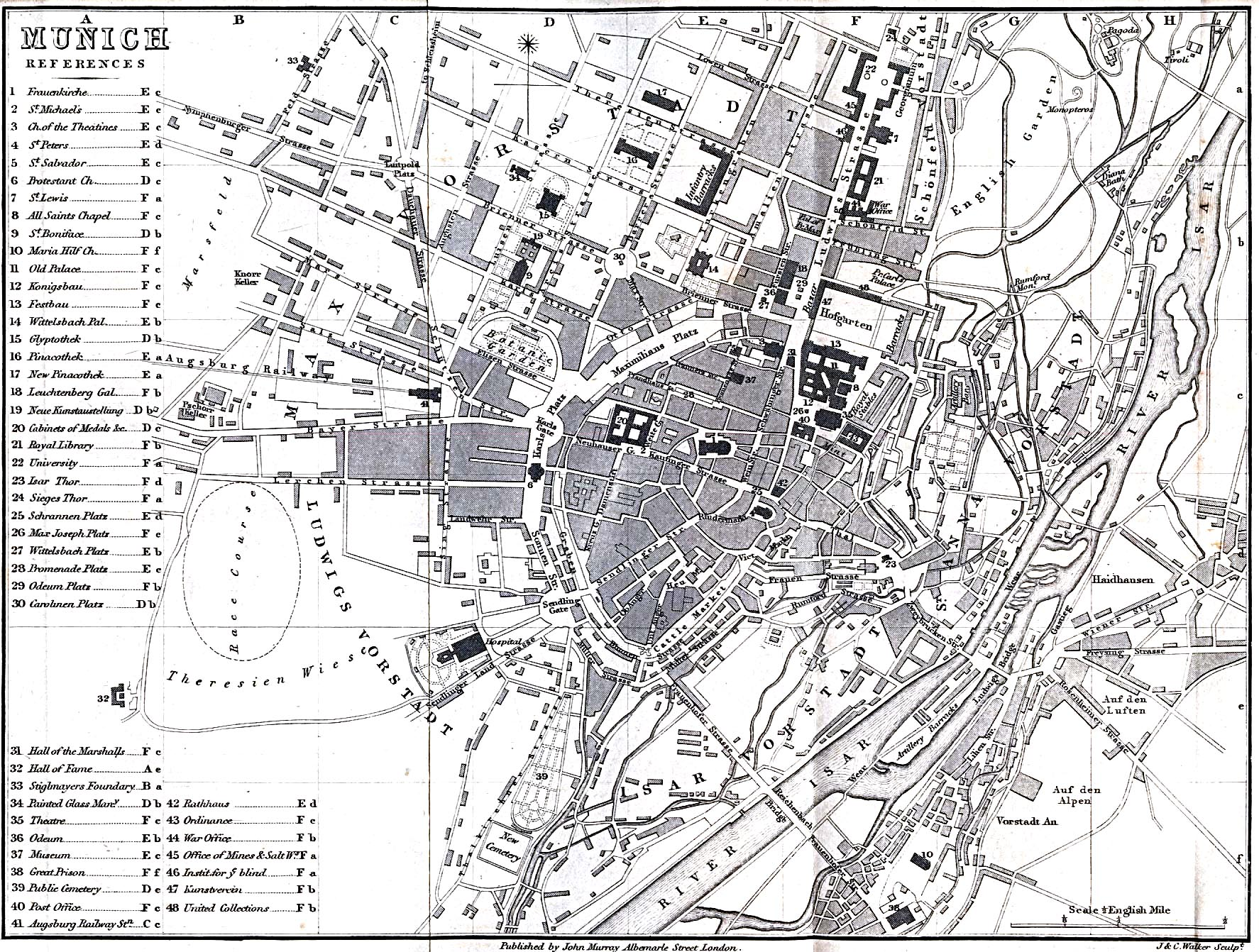
Munich, town map 1858

After making an alliance with Napoleonic France, the city became the capital of the new Kingdom of Bavaria in 1806 with Elector Maximilian IV Joseph becoming its first king. The state parliament (the Landtag) and the new archdiocese of Munich and Freising were also located in the city. Twenty years later, the Ludwig-Maximilians-Universität was moved from Landshut to Munich.

The establishment of Bavarian state sovereignty profoundly affected Munich. Munich became the center of a modernizing kingdom, and one of the king's first acts was the secularization of Bavaria. He had dissolved all monasteries in 1802 and once crowned, Maximilian Joseph generated state revenues by selling off church lands. While many monasteries were reestablished, Maximilian Joseph I succeeded in controlling the right to brew beer (Braurecht). The king handed the brewing monopoly to Munich's wealthiest brewers, who in turn paid substantial taxes on their beer production. In 1807 the king abolished all ordinances that limited the number of apprentices and journeymen a brewery could employ. Munich's population had swelled and Munich brewers were now free to employ as many workers as they needed to meet the demand. In October 1810 a beer festival was held on the meadows just outside Munich to commemorate the wedding of the crown prince and princess Therese of Saxe-Hildburghausen. The parades in regional dress (Tracht) represented the diversity of the kingdom. The fields are now part of the Theresienwiese and the celebrations developed into Munich's annual Oktoberfest.

The Bavarian state proceeded to take control over the beer market, by regulating all taxes on beer in 1806 and 1811. Brewers and the beer taverns (Wirtshäuser) were taxed, and the state also controlled the quality of beer while limiting the competition among breweries. In 1831 the king's government introduced a cost-of-living allowance on beer for lower-ranking civil servants and soldiers. Soldiers stationed in Munich were granted a daily allowance for beer in the early 1840s. By the 1850s beer had become essential staple food for Munich's working and lower classes. Since the Middle Ages beer had been regarded as nutritious liquid bread (fließendes Brot) in Bavaria. But Munich suffered from poor water sanitation and as early as the 1700s beer came to be regarded as the fifth element. Beer was essential in maintaining public health in Munich and in the mid-1840s Munich police estimated that at least 40,000 residents relied primarily on beer for their nutrition.

The first Munich railway station was built in 1839, with a line going to Augsburg in the west. By 1849 a newer Munich Central Train Station (München Hauptbahnhof) was completed, with a line going to Landshut and Regensburg in the north.

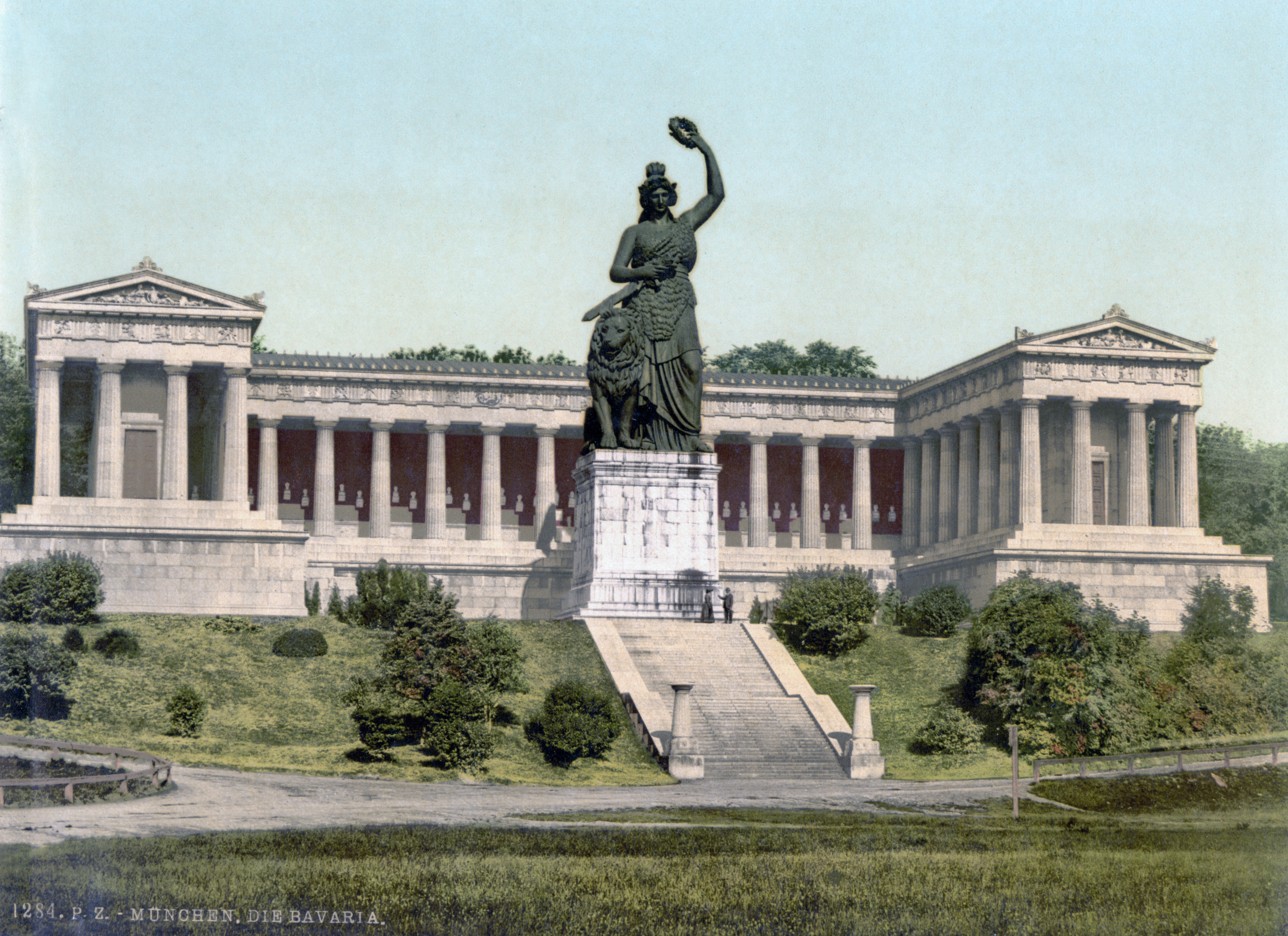
The Bavaria with the Ruhmeshalle, opened in 1850

Many of the city's finest buildings belong to this period and were built under the reign of King Ludwig I. These neoclassical buildings include the Ruhmeshalle with the Bavaria statue by Ludwig Michael von Schwanthaler and those on the magnificent Ludwigstraße and the Königsplatz, built by the architects Leo von Klenze and Friedrich von Gärtner. Under King Max II the Maximilianstraße was constructed in Perpendicular style. Leo von Klenze supervised the construction of a Propylaea between 1854 and 1862. In 1857 the construction of the Maximilianeum was begun. Between 1856 and 1861 the court gardener Carl von Effner landscaped the banks of the river Isar and established the Maximilian Gardens. The grand building projects of Ludwig I gave Munich the endearment "Isar-Athen" and "Monaco di Bavaria".

During the early to mid-19th century, the old fortified city walls of Munich were largely demolished due to population expansion. The first Munich railway station was built in 1839, with a line going to Augsburg in the west. By 1849 a newer Munich Central Train Station (München Hauptbahnhof) was completed, with a line going to Landshut and Regensburg in the north. This was followed by trams in 1876 and electric lighting in 1882. The Technical University of Munich was founded in 1868. The city hosted Germany's first exhibition of electricity, and in 1930 the first ever television was showcased at the city's Deutsches Museum (founded in 1903) on the banks of the Isar. In 1900 Wilhelm Röntgen moved to Munich, where he was appointed as a professor of physics. In 1901 he was awarded the Nobel Prize in Physics. Numerous other inventors and scientists worked in Munich, including Alois Senefelder, Joseph von Fraunhofer, Justus von Liebig, Georg Ohm, Carl von Linde, Rudolf Diesel, Emil Kraepelin and Alois Alzheimer, and the young Albert Einstein attended the Luitpold Gymnasium. In 1911 the Hellabrunn Zoo opened in the city.

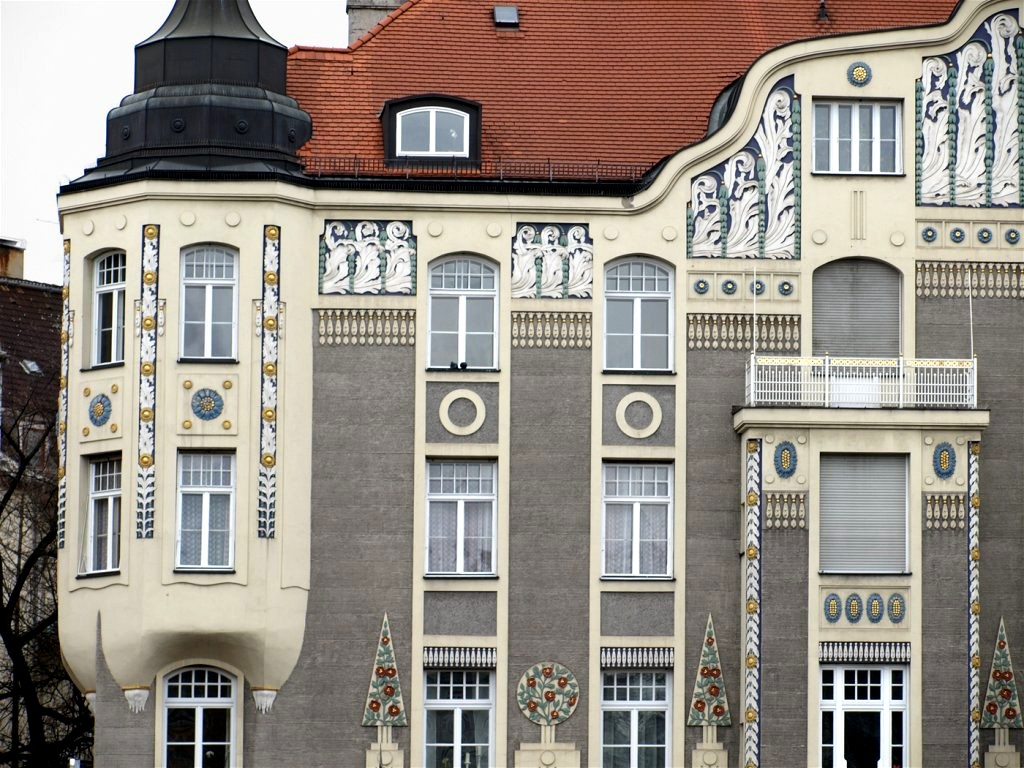
Jugendstil style house at Leopoldstr. 77. At the beginning of the 20th century, Munich was a hub for the Jugendstil movement.

The Prince Regent Luitpold's reign from 1886 to 1912 was marked by tremendous artistic and cultural activity in Munich. Thomas Mann, Henrik Ibsen, Richard Wagner, Richard Strauss and many others prominent figures lived and worked there during this time. At the dawn of the 20th century Munich was an epicenter for the Jugendstil movement, combining a liberal magazine culture with progressive industrial design and architecture. The German art movement took its name from the Munich magazine Die Jugend (The Youth). Prominent Munich Jugendstil artists include Hans Eduard von Berlepsch-Valendas, Otto Eckmann, Margarethe von Brauchitsch, August Endell, Hermann Obrist, Wilhelm von Debschitz, and Richard Riemerschmid. In 1905 two large department stores opened in Munich, the Kaufhaus Oberpollinger and the Warenhaus Hermann Tietz, both having been designed by the architect Max Littmann. In 1911 the expressionist group Der Blaue Reiter was established in Munich. Its founding members include Gabriele Münter.

In 1846 Munich's population was about 100,000, and by 1901 this had risen to about 500,000.

== World War I and Weimar Republic ==
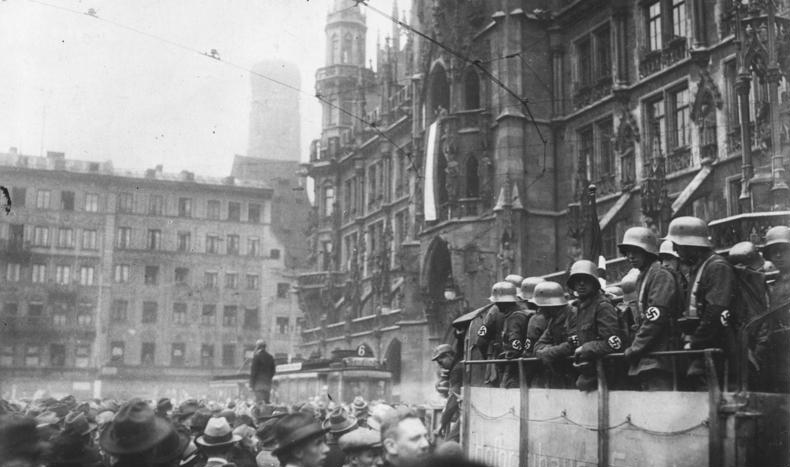
Unrest during the 1923 Beer Hall Putsch, a failed coup d'état led by Adolf Hitler, Erich Ludendorff, and other Kampfbund leaders

Following the outbreak of World War I in 1914, life in Munich became very difficult due to the Allied blockade of Germany, which led to food and coal shortages. During French air raids in 1916, three bombs fell on Munich.

After World War I, the city was at the centre of substantial political unrest. On 12 November 1918, early in the German revolution, mass demonstrations and the formation of a revolutionary workers' and soldiers' council in Munich led Ludwig III of Bavaria to flee the city and then abdicate. On 21 February 1919, a far-right Bavarian nationalist, Anton Graf von Arco auf Valley, assassinated Kurt Eisner, the Bavarian minister-president who had been placed in office through the power of the workers' and soldiers' councils. In April, the councils proclaimed the Bavarian Soviet Republic. On 30 April 1919, when some 35,000 government and Freikorps troops already had Munich encircled in preparation for putting an end to the Republic, members of the Red Army killed ten men they were holding hostage. Reacting to exaggerated reports of a massacre, Freikorps units ignored orders for a coordinated entry into Munich and unleashed a "white terror" on the city. By the time the Soviet Republic was defeated on 3 May, 606 dead were counted, 335 of them civilians.

After the council republic had been put down and the republican government restored, Munich became a hotbed of right-wing politics, among which Adolf Hitler and the Nazis rose to prominence. In Mein Kampf Hitler described his political actions in Munich after November 1918 as the "beginning of my political activity". He called the short-lived Bavarian Soviet Republic "the rule of the Jews".

In 1919 Bavaria Film was founded, and in the 1920s Munich offered filmmakers an alternative to Germany's largest film studio, the Babelsberg Studio in Berlin.

In 1923 the right-wing politician Gustav von Kahr was chosen prime minister by the Bavarian parliament and immediately planned for the expulsion of all Jews who did not hold German citizenship. Munich Chief of Police Ernst Pöhner and the head of its political division Wilhelm Frick were openly antisemitic, and Bavarian judges praised people on the political right as patriotic for their crimes and handed down mild sentences. In 1923, Hitler and his supporters, who were concentrated in Munich, staged the Beer Hall Putsch, an attempt to overthrow the Weimar Republic and seize power. The revolt failed, resulting in Hitler's arrest and the temporary crippling of the Nazi Party. At the end of the Residenzstrasse, where the putsch resulted in the death of 16 Nazis and four policemen, the government of Bavaria placed a plaque after the war with the names of the four policemen who died there.

== Nazi regime and World War II ==
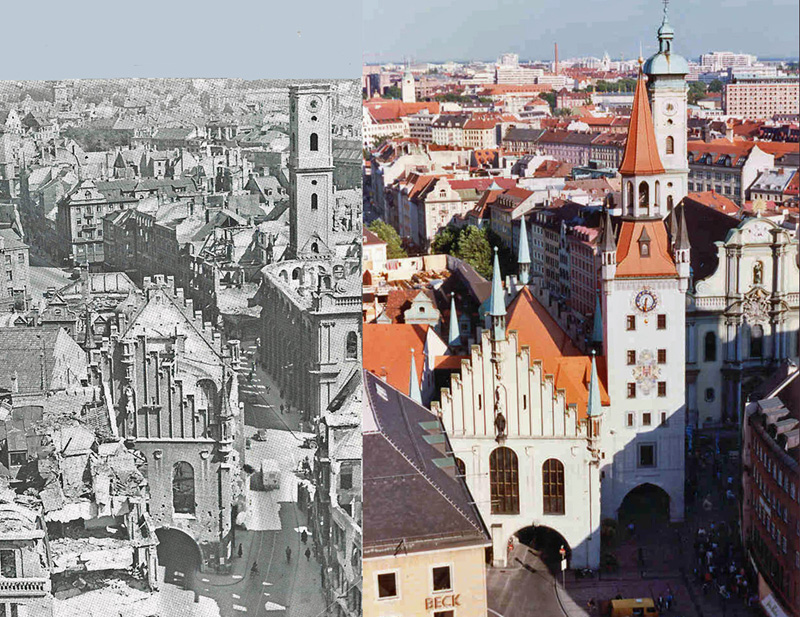
View of Munich city centre in 1945 after the devastation of World War II, and in 1989 after reconstruction, featuring the restored Old Town Hall, Heilig-Geist-Kirche, and Talburgtor

The city once again became a Nazi stronghold when the Nazis took power in Germany in 1933. The Nazis created the first concentration camp at Dachau, 10 miles (16 km) northwest of the city. Because of its importance to the rise of Nazism, the Nazis called Munich the Hauptstadt der Bewegung ("Capital of the Movement"). The Nazi Party headquarters were in Munich and many Führerbauten ("Führer-buildings") were built around the Königsplatz, some of which have survived to this day. During the Night of the Long Knives in 1934, Hitler eliminated potential political rivals. Ernst Röhm was killed in Munich's Stadelheim Prison.

In 1938, the Munich Agreement, Neville Chamberlain's famous act of appeasement to Hitler, was signed in the city by representatives of Germany, Italy, France and the Britain. It ceded the mostly German-speaking regions of Czechoslovakia, called the Sudetenland, to Germany. On 8 November 1939, shortly after the Second World War had begun, Georg Elser planted a bomb in the Bürgerbräukeller in Munich in an attempt to assassinate Adolf Hitler, who held a political party speech. Hitler, however, had left the building minutes before the bomb went off.

During the war, Munich was the location of multiple forced labour camps, including two Polenlager camps for Polish youth, and 40 subcamps of the Dachau concentration camp, including Agfa-Commando, Munich-Allach, München-Schwabing, in which men and women of various nationalities were held. By mid 1942 the majority of Jews living in Munich and the suburbs had been deported.

Munich was the base of the White Rose, a student resistance movement. The group had distributed leaflets in several cities and following the 1943 Battle of Stalingrad members of the group stenciled slogans such as "Down with Hitler" and "Hitler the Mass Murderer" on public buildings in Munich. The core members were arrested and executed after Sophie Scholl and her brother Hans Scholl were caught distributing leaflets on the campus of the Ludwig-Maximilians-Universität München, calling upon the youth to rise against Hitler.

The city was heavily damaged by Allied bombing during World War II—it was hit by 71 air raids over a period of six years. As the bombings continued, more and more people moved out. By May 1945, 337,000 people (41%) had left.

The final battle for Munich began on 29 April 1945, when the US 20th Armored Division. US 3rd Infantry Division, US 42nd Infantry Division and US 45th Infantry Division assaulted through the outskirts of the city, also liberating Dachau concentration camp in the process. Some sectors were well defended against this opening push. However, the city itself was captured rather easily, as the German defenders there offered only light resistance, on 30 April 1945.

== Postwar Munich ==
In the aftermath of World War II, Germany was subject to US Military occupation. Due to Polish annexation of the Former eastern territories of Germany and expulsion of Germans from all over Eastern Europe, Munich operated over a thousand refugee camps for 151,113 people in October 1946. After American occupation in 1945, Munich was completely rebuilt following a meticulous and—by comparison to other war-ravaged German cities—rather conservative plan which preserved its pre-war street grid. The Residenz, the Hofbräuhaus, the Frauenkirche, and the Peterskirche were reconstructed to look exactly as they did before the Nazi Party seized power in 1933. In 1957, Munich's population surpassed one million. The city continued to play a highly significant role in the German economy, politics and culture, giving rise to its nickname Heimliche Hauptstadt ("secret capital") in the decades after World War II. In Munich, the Bayerischer Rundfunk began its first television broadcast in 1954.

The Free State of Bavaria used the arms industry as kernel for its high tech development policy. Since 1963, Munich has been hosting the Munich Security Conference, held annually in the Hotel Bayerischer Hof. Munich also became known on the political level due to the strong influence of Bavarian politician Franz Josef Strauss from the 1960s to the 1980s. The Munich Airport, which commenced operations in 1992, was named in his honor.

In the early 1960s Dieter Kunzelmann was expelled from the Situationist International and founded an influential group called Subversive Aktion in Munich. Kunzelmann was also active in West Berlin, and became known for using situationist avant-garde as a cover for political violence.

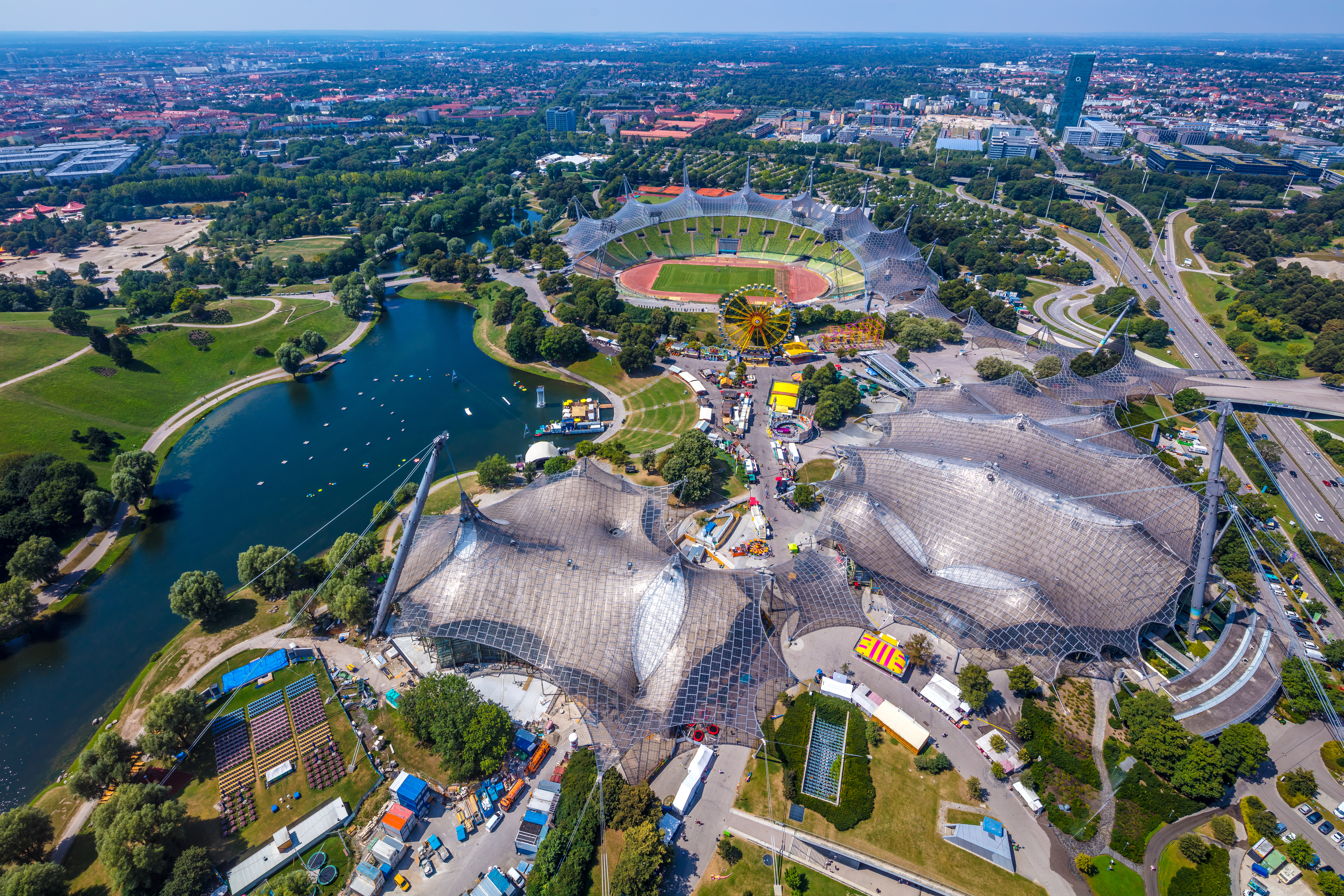
Olympiapark was the main venue for the 1972 Olympic Games and also hosted the 1974 FIFA World Cup final.

Munich hosted the 1972 Summer Olympics. After winning the bid in 1966 the Mayor of Munich Hans-Jochen Vogel accelerated the construction of the U-Bahn subway and the S-Bahn metropolitan commuter railway. In May 1967 the construction work began for a new U-Bahn line connecting the city with the Olympic Park. The Olympic Park subway station was built near the BMW Headquarters and the line was completed in May 1972, three months before the opening of the 1972 Summer Olympics. Shortly before the opening ceremony, Munich also inaugurated a sizable pedestrian priority zone between Karlsplatz and Marienplatz. In 1970 the Munich city council released funds so that the iconic gothic facade and Glockenspiel of the New City Hall (Neues Rathaus) could be restored.

During the 1972 Summer Olympics 11 Israeli athletes were murdered by Palestinian terrorists in the Munich massacre, when gunmen from the Palestinian "Black September" group took hostage members of the Israeli Olympic team.

Several games of the 1974 World Cup were also held in the city, including the German triumph against the Netherlands in a legendary final. Several games of the 2006 World Cup were also held in Munich.

The most deadly militant attack the Federal Republic of Germany has ever witnessed was the Oktoberfest bombing. The attack was eventually blamed on militant Neo-Nazism.

Munich and its urban sprawl emerged as the leading German high tech region during the 1980s and 1990s. The urban economy of Munich became characterized by a dynamic labour market, low unemployment, a growing service economy and high per capita income. In 1992 Munich's new airport was inaugurated and the inauguration of the Neue Messe, the new exhibition centre on the site of the former airport of Riem, took place in 1998.

In 2007 the ecological restoration of the river Isar in the urban area of Munich was awarded the Water Development Prize by the German Association for Water, Wastewater and Waste (known as DWA in German). The renaturation of the Isar allows for the near natural development of the river bed and is part of Munich's flood protection. About 20% of buildings in Munich now have a green roof. Munich city council has been encouraging better stormwater management since the 1990s with regulations and subsidies.

On the fifth anniversary of the 2011 Norway attacks an active shooter perpetrated a hate crime. The 2016 Munich shooting targeted people of Turkish and Arab descent.

Munich was one of the host cities for both UEFA Euro 2020 – postponed by a year because of the COVID-19 pandemic – and UEFA Euro 2024.

== See also ==
- Timeline of Munich
- History of the Jews in Munich
- Economic history of Munich
