= Economy of Munich =

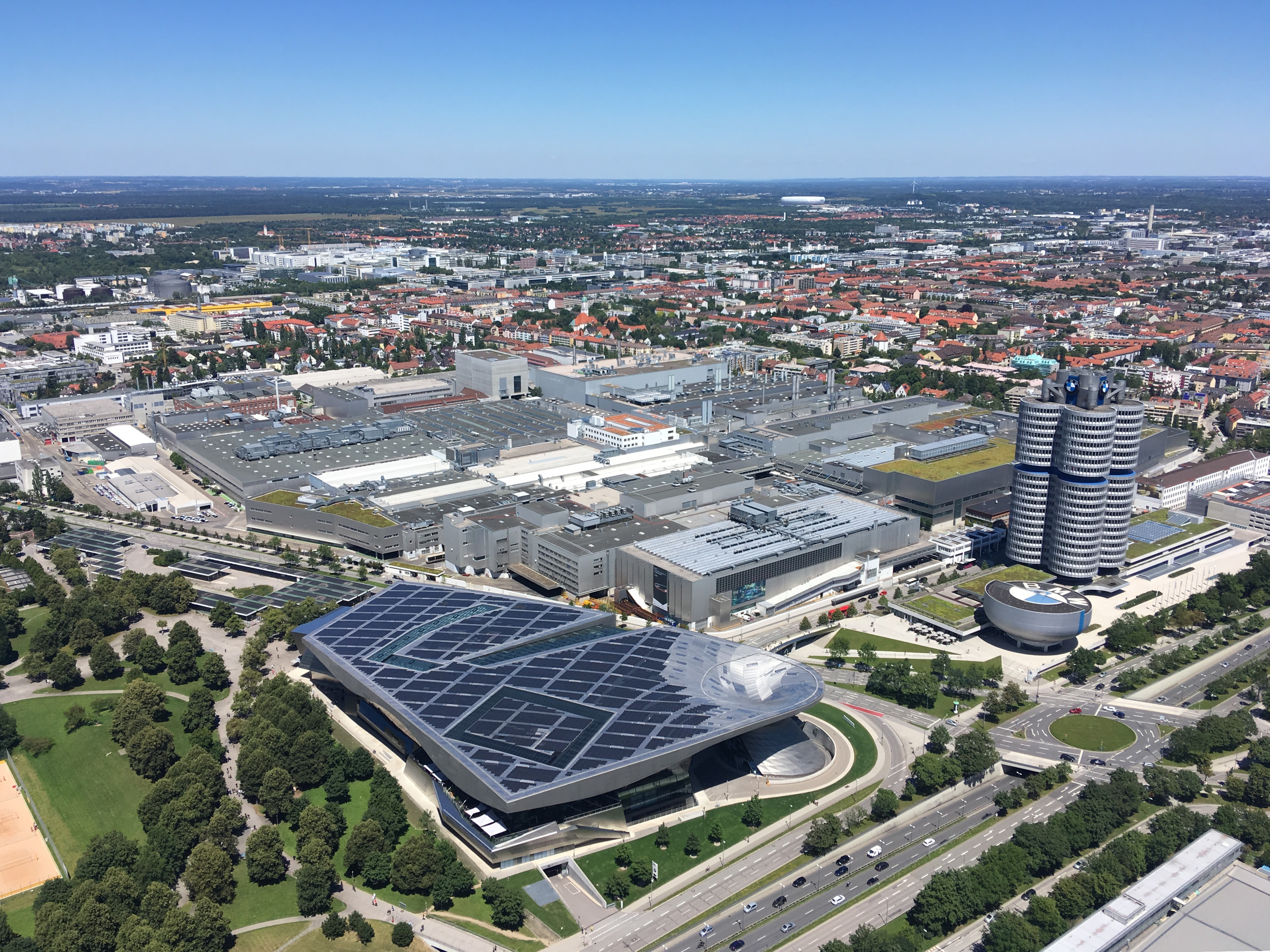
Aerial view of BMW's headquarters and manufacturing plant in Munich

Munich, the capital of Bavaria, is a major German centre of manufacturing, insurance and business services. In 2024, the city generated a gross domestic product (GDP) of approximately €152 billion. GDP per person in employment was €125,211, compared with €94,135 across Germany. Services accounted for around 80 per cent of the city's gross value added, while manufacturing contributed approximately 16 per cent.

Munich is home to major corporations including BMW, Siemens, Allianz and Munich Re. Its manufacturing industries include motor vehicles, machinery and electrical equipment, while other important sectors include information technology, professional services, media, tourism and trade fairs. The city's universities, notably LMU Munich and the Technical University of Munich, form part of a regional innovation network that includes research institutions, established companies and start-ups.

Munich's early economic development was closely associated with the salt trade, and its market was confirmed in 1158. During the 19th century, mechanical engineering, industrial brewing, banking and insurance expanded. Following the Second World War, Siemens & Halske and Allianz established their main administrative offices in Munich. During the latter decades of the 20th century, the city and its surrounding region developed into a major centre for high-technology industries and services.

Munich's economy is closely integrated with its surrounding districts. Approximately 976,000 employees subject to social security contributions worked in the city in June 2025, including commuters from outside its boundaries. In 2024, Munich had the highest consumer price level in Germany, at nearly 24 per cent above the national average.

== Economic history ==
=== Trade and early industry ===
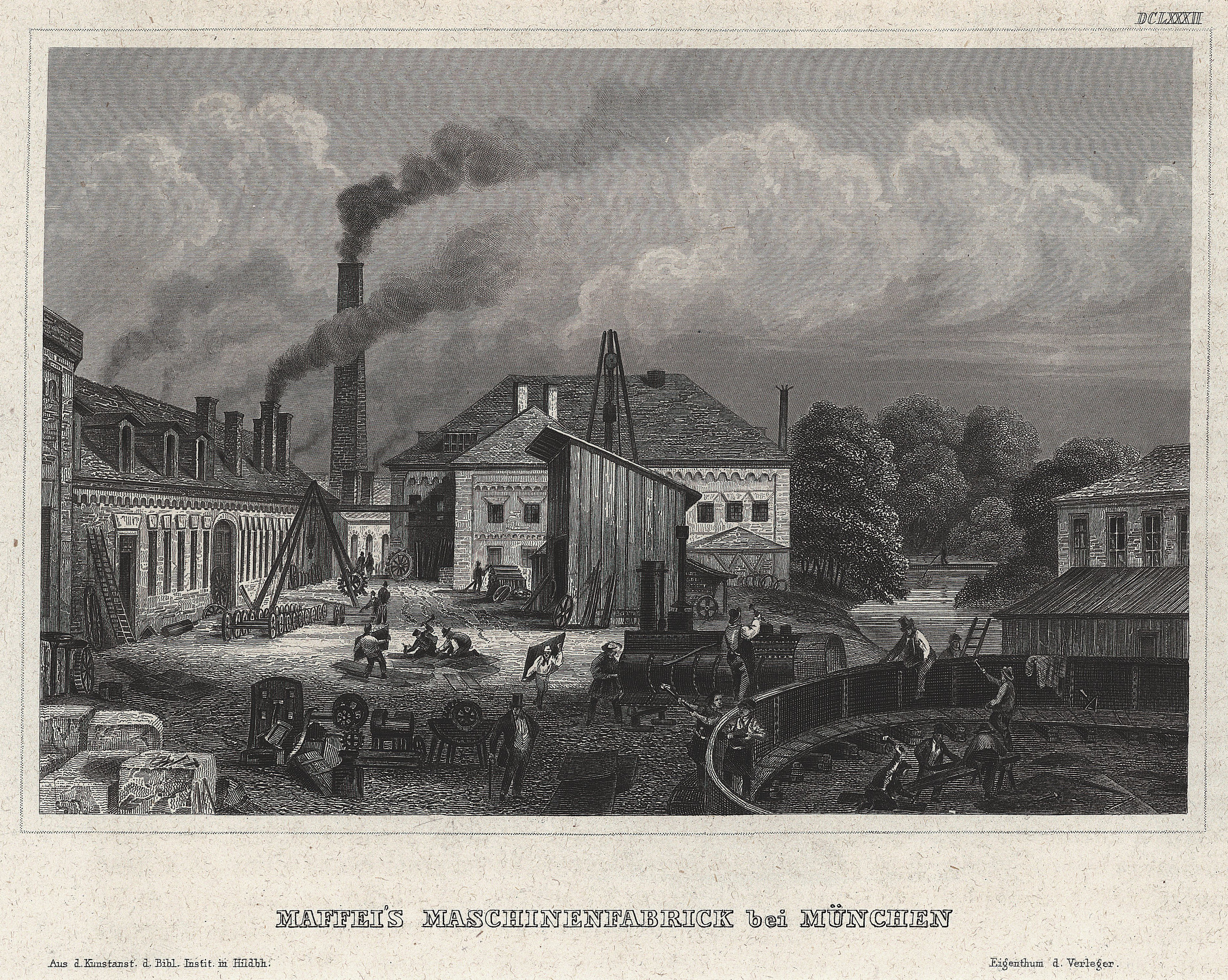
Maffei's engineering works at Hirschau near Munich, illustrated in 1857

Munich is first mentioned in a document recording Emperor Frederick Barbarossa's settlement of a dispute between Duke Henry the Lion and Bishop Otto of Freising in 1158. The settlement confirmed Munich's market and granted the Church of Freising a third of the revenues from the Munich market toll. A salt route from Reichenhall ran through Munich, whose growth from the mid-12th century the historian Johannes Lang associates with receipts from the salt trade.

Late medieval merchants in Munich traded in cloth and wine. A shoemakers' guild is documented in Munich in 1290, and around two centuries later the city had 44 craft guilds. In the late Middle Ages, Munich was less commercially powerful than Augsburg or Nuremberg. Until the mid-19th century, craftspeople and small businesses commonly financed expansion from their own income or loans from relatives and friends. The growth of housing construction in the second half of the 19th century was accompanied by an expansion of mortgage lending. Munich's developing private-bank sector included the firms that later operated as H. Aufhäuser and Merck Finck, both founded in 1870. Balbaschewski records 82 private banks in Munich in 1890 and 48 in 1920. He describes differences in the business models of H. Aufhäuser and Merck Finck, while also noting that the two banks had maintained business relations from an early stage.

In 1838, Joseph Anton von Maffei acquired an ironworks in Munich. His works produced their first locomotive in 1841. Georg Krauss established another locomotive factory in the city in 1866.

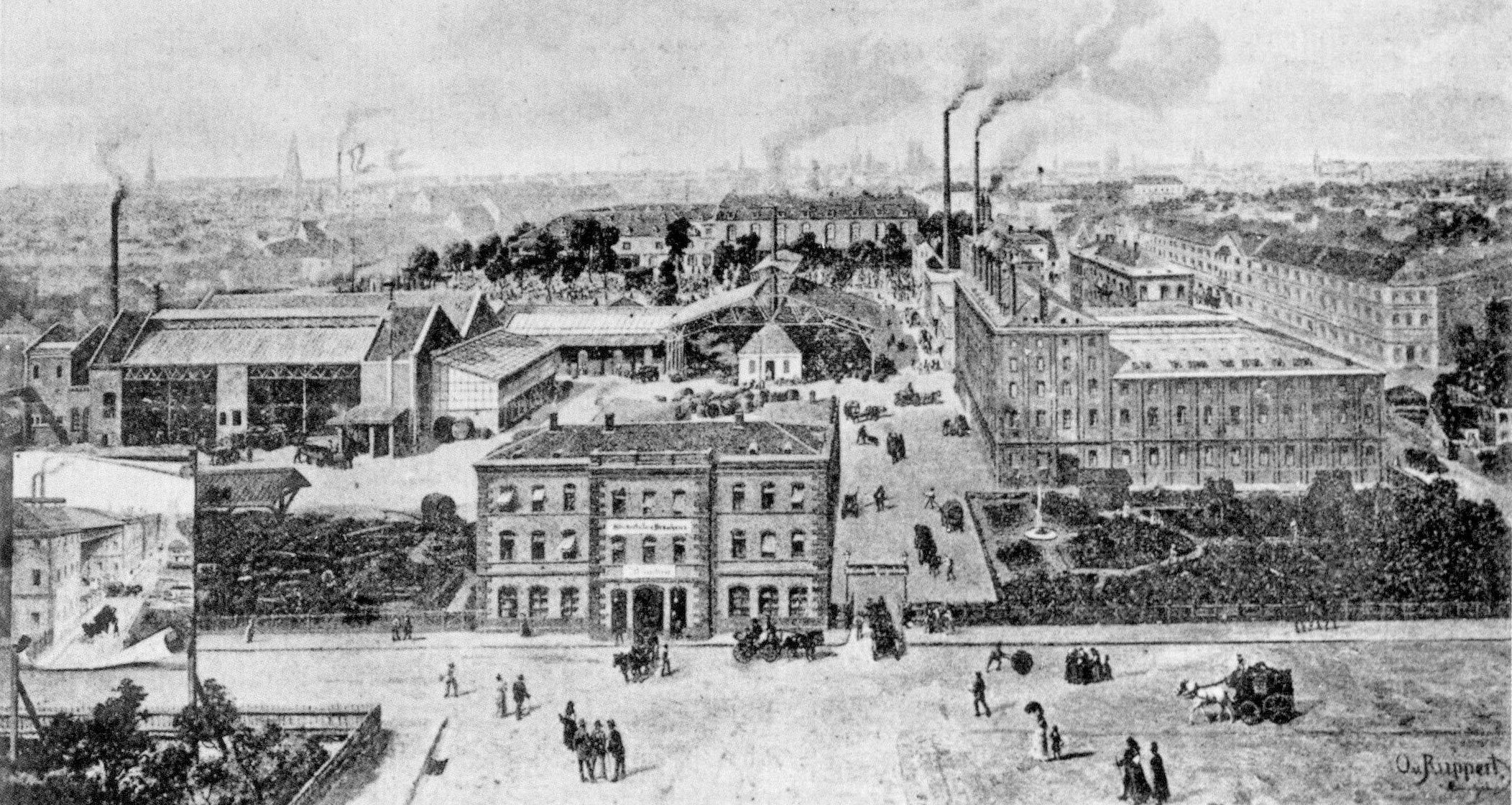
The Bürgerliches Brauhaus brewery in Munich in 1891

Munich's brewing industry grew rapidly in the second half of the 19th century, driven mainly by rising local demand. From 1873, the Spaten brewer Gabriel Sedlmayr funded Carl von Linde's refrigeration experiments and provided space for them. Refrigeration and commercial pressures led large Bavarian breweries to operate throughout the year. The historians of brewing Martin Zarnkow and Franz Meußdoerffer identify better preservation and refrigerated transport among the factors behind rising beer exports from the Munich customs district around 1900.

Munich Re was established in Munich in 1880. According to historian Johannes Bähr, its founding involved the bank Merck, Finck & Co., the lawyer Hermann Pemsel, acting for the industrialist Theodor von Cramer-Klett, and the insurance agent Carl von Thieme. Thieme was also instrumental in founding Allianz in 1890. Allianz was established in Berlin and maintained close financial relationships with Munich Re.

Karl Heinrich Pohl describes Munich's industry before the First World War as less concentrated in large establishments than that of several other German industrial cities. In 1907, small and medium-sized establishments accounted for about 70 per cent of employment in Munich. Pohl counted 279 establishments with more than 50 people and found that skilled workers outnumbered unskilled workers.

=== The First World War and interwar crises ===
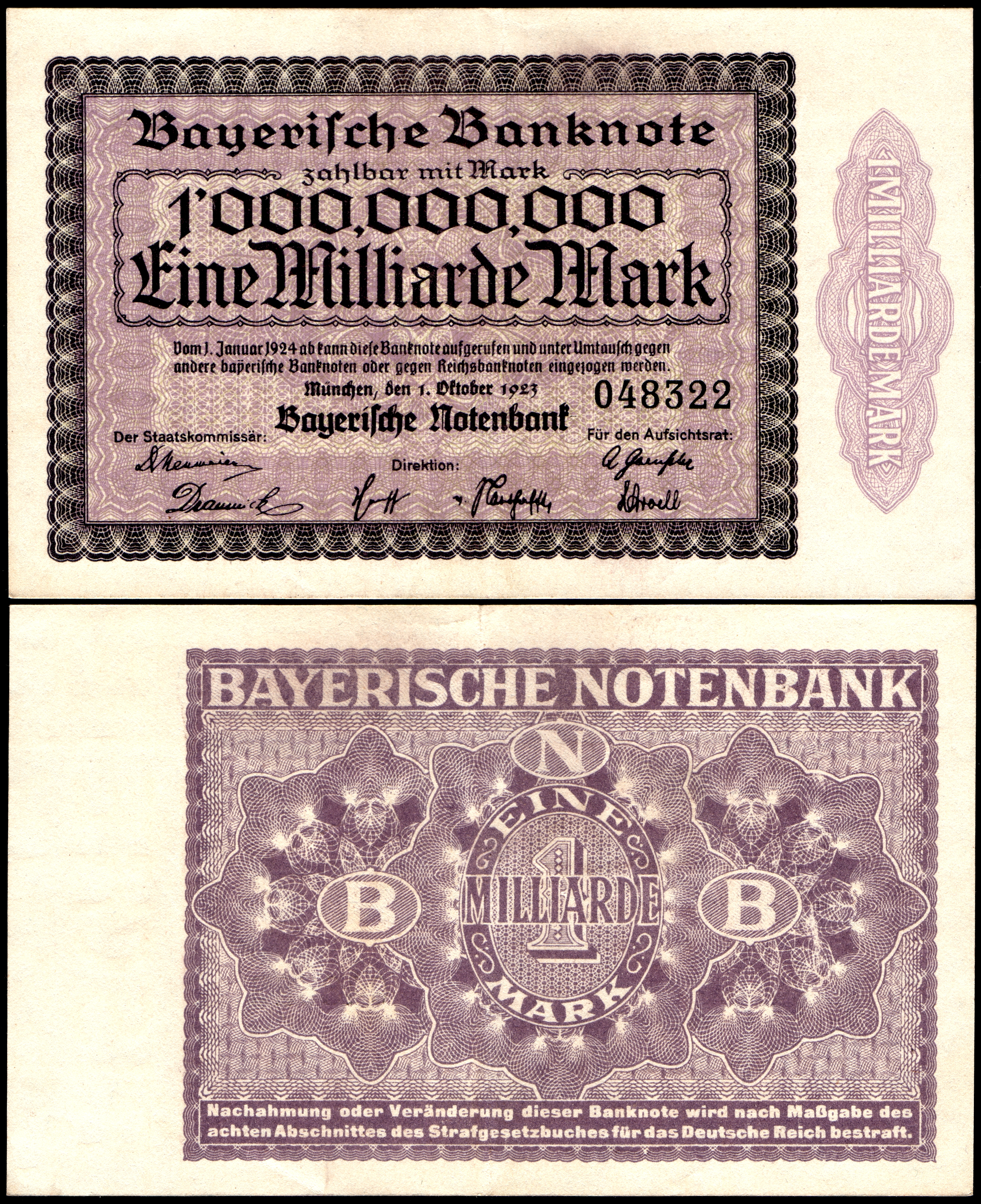
One-billion-mark banknote issued by the Bayerische Notenbank in Munich during the hyperinflation of 1923

Existing state-owned factories in Munich took part in armaments production during the First World War. A Krupp armaments factory opened in Freimann in 1917. Workers in Munich took part in the January 1918 strike against the continuation of the war.

After the armistice in 1918, demobilisation, unemployment and housing shortages remained major challenges. The city created welfare, youth and public health offices in the years after the war. Hyperinflation in 1923 brought a further crisis for the city and its residents.

Economic conditions improved after the stabilisation of the currency but deteriorated again during the Great Depression. In 1928, H. Aufhäuser arranged a £1.625 million bond issue (about 30 million Reichsmark) through the London bank Lazard to finance improvements to Munich's energy supply. The depression hit mechanical and vehicle engineering in Munich, Augsburg and Nuremberg. The Munich locomotive manufacturers Krauss and Maffei merged in 1931. The city's budget was strained by falling revenue and rising welfare expenditure. The historian Katja Klee reports that poverty affected about a quarter of Munich's residents in 1932.

=== The Nazi economy ===
After the Nazi seizure of power in 1933, Jewish-owned businesses in Munich faced boycotts, professional restrictions and forced sales or liquidation. An agency established by the local Nazi Party leadership in November 1938 helped organise the expropriation of Jewish property, particularly housing. The Jewish-owned private bank H. Aufhäuser was forcibly transferred and continued under the name Seiler & Co. The bank initially resisted attempts to force its transfer to non-Jewish ownership, but the November 1938 pogrom disrupted negotiations over its future.

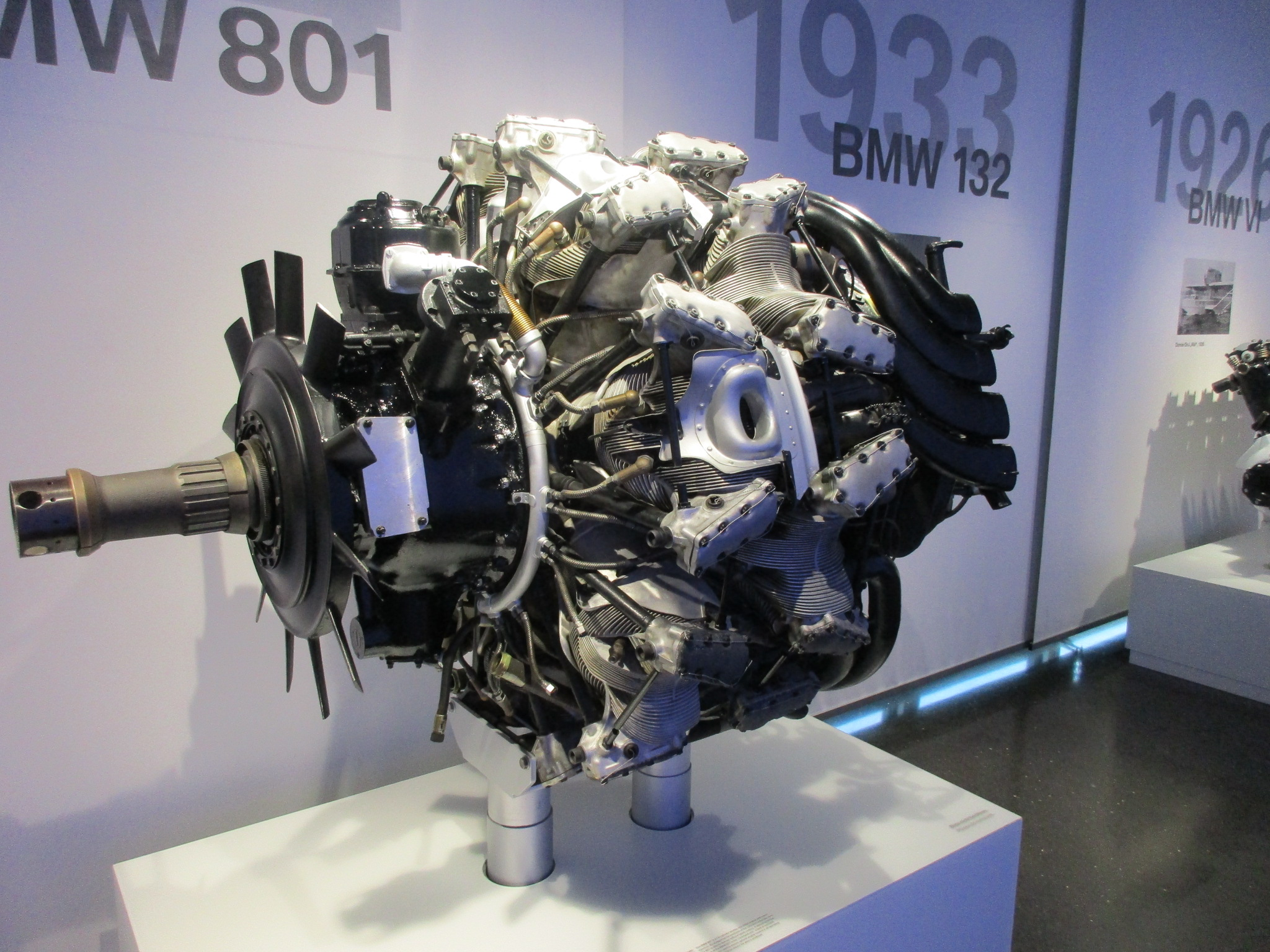
BMW 801 aircraft engine manufactured during the Second World War, displayed at the BMW Museum in Munich

Aircraft production became a focus of Munich's armaments industry after the outbreak of the Second World War. During rearmament, BMW expanded aircraft-engine production and built an assembly and repair plant at Allach between 1936 and 1939. The historian Katja Klee describes BMW as Munich's most important private-sector employer at the outbreak of the war.

Krauss-Maffei made military locomotives and half-tracked vehicles, while optical and precision-engineering firms supplied components for the Luftwaffe. The Reichsbahn maintained locomotives and wagons at its Freimann and Neuaubing workshops.

Historian Andreas Heusler describes forced labour in wartime Munich as a widespread and visible feature of economic life. Labourers' treatment varied according to the racist hierarchy imposed by the Nazi regime. Compulsory labour was used not only in armaments factories but also in transport, other businesses and private households.

According to the Munich Documentation Centre for the History of National Socialism, at least 150,000 people deported from territories occupied by Germany performed forced labour in Munich during the Second World War. More than 400 collective accommodation sites were located within the city boundaries.

Allied bombing damaged BMW's production facilities. At BMW, Allied occupation authorities subsequently dismantled equipment at parts of the Munich works, while other facilities were converted to civilian production.

=== Post-war reconstruction ===
On 1 April 1949, the boards of Siemens decided to relocate the head offices of Siemens & Halske to Munich and Siemens-Schuckert to Erlangen, with Berlin retained as a second seat. The company subsequently expanded research and data-processing operations in Munich, including a large complex at Perlach.

Siemens headquarters at Wittelsbacherplatz in central Munich

Allianz transferred its main administration from Berlin to Munich in 1949. Economic geographers Hans-Martin Zademach and Robert Musil identify Allianz's ties to Munich Re as one of the principal reasons for its move. Following the Second World War, Munich Re lost all its foreign assets for the second time in thirty years. The company resumed its international business in the early 1950s, re-entering the US market in 1952 and establishing a subsidiary there in 1956.

Zademach and Musil describe close connections between Munich's regional banks and local businesses during the 1960s, followed by greater internationalisation of banking from the 1970s.

The Free State of Bavaria used the arms industry as kernel for its high tech development policy.

=== Structural change since the 1990s ===
Munich and its urban sprawl emerged as the leading German high tech region during the 1980s and 1990s. The urban economy of Munich became characterised by a dynamic labour market, low unemployment, a growing service economy and high per capita income.

Munich's regional film and television industry underwent restructuring after the Kirch Group became insolvent in 2002. In his study of the cluster, Hans-Martin Zademach found that new financial investors initially weakened some established relationships, but that their arrival also opened opportunities for reorganisation.

The COVID-19 pandemic disrupted the labour market in 2020. Munich's statistical office recorded an increase in registered unemployment from 33,651 people in January to 48,996 in August, accompanied by a decline in registered vacancies during the spring and summer.

== Economic structure ==
=== Output and productivity ===
According to provisional regional accounts, Munich generated €151.996 billion in GDP and €137.682 billion in gross value added at current prices in 2024. Nominal GDP was 3.7 per cent higher than in 2023. GDP per resident was €101,543 in Munich and €60,258 in Bavaria.

Selected economic indicators for Munich
| Indicator | Value | Period |
|---|---|---|
| Gross domestic product | €151.996 billion | 2024 |
| Gross value added | €137.682 billion | 2024 |
| GDP per resident | €101,543 | 2024 |
| GDP per person in employment | €125,211 | 2024 |
| GDP per hour worked | €90.90 | 2024 |
| Employees subject to social security contributions at their workplace | 976,230 | 30 June 2025 |
| Net inward commuters subject to social security contributions | 249,440 | 30 June 2025 |

GDP per person in employment was €125,211 in 2024, compared with €94,135 across Germany. GDP per hour worked was €90.90 in Munich, €75.97 in Bavaria and €70.55 in Germany. These are nominal workplace-based measures for the city, distinct from those of the surrounding district (Landkreis München).

Services produced 79.6 per cent of Munich's gross value added in 2024. The producing sector, including construction, accounted for 20.4 per cent of total gross value added. Manufacturing, a component of that sector, accounted for 16.4 per cent of total gross value added. Agriculture, forestry and fishing together accounted for less than 0.1 per cent.

=== Employment and labour market ===
On 30 June 2025, Munich recorded 976,230 employees subject to compulsory social security contributions at workplaces within the city, regardless of where those employees lived. The service sector employed 826,064 of them, or 84.6 per cent of the total, while the wider producing sector employed 149,518. Manufacturing accounted for 108,145 employees.

Employees subject to social security contributions at workplaces in Munich, by selected economic activity, 30 June 2025
| Economic activity | Employees | Share of total |
|---|---|---|
| Professional, scientific and technical services and other business services | 225,748 | 23.1% |
| Public administration, defence and social security, education, health and social work | 203,241 | 20.8% |
| Trade, transport, accommodation and food services | 161,263 | 16.5% |
| Information and communication | 111,264 | 11.4% |
| Manufacturing | 108,145 | 11.1% |
| Financial and insurance activities | 61,636 | 6.3% |
| Arts, entertainment and recreation, other services, private households and extraterritorial organisations | 51,499 | 5.3% |
| Construction | 23,768 | 2.4% |
| Real estate activities | 11,413 | 1.2% |

Selected non-overlapping categories from the municipal statistical office's economic-activity breakdown. The table omits 17,605 employees in other producing activities, 645 in agriculture, forestry and fishing, and three whose sector was unspecified.

The city's annual average unemployment rate was 5.4 per cent in 2025, while the Munich employment-agency area had an average of 5.0 per cent. The city's economic development office reports that more than 43.1 per cent of employees subject to social insurance held an academic degree.

=== Municipal finances ===
In the city's cash-flow accounts, gross trade tax receipts were €3.554 billion in 2025. Debt in the municipal budget totalled €7.314 billion at the end of 2025, an increase of 35.8 per cent from the end of 2024.

=== The city and its economic region ===
The Munich planning region consists of the city and eight surrounding districts. In a study of advanced producer services and high-technology firms, Lüthi, Thierstein and Goebel identified a polycentric pattern of company locations and strongly localised value chains in the greater Munich area.

Infineon Technologies has its headquarters in Neubiberg. The registered head office of ProSiebenSat.1 Media is in Unterföhring. Bavaria Film lists its company address in Geiselgasteig.

== Economic sectors ==
=== Manufacturing and mobility industries ===
Vehicle-body inspection at BMW's Munich plant in 1968

Munich's manufacturing industries include motor vehicles, machinery and electrical equipment. BMW has its corporate headquarters and an automobile plant in the city. MAN Truck & Bus manufactures trucks at its Munich plant. Siemens Mobility manufactures locomotives at its Munich-Allach works. MTU Aero Engines has its headquarters in Munich. After the 1931 merger, Krauss-Maffei moved its headquarters and production facilities from Munich to Allach. Allach became part of Munich in 1938. After the Second World War, the works repaired locomotives before resuming manufacture.

The municipal statistical office recorded €82.2 billion in manufacturing turnover in 2024, including €64.9 billion in foreign turnover, in establishments belonging to enterprises with at least 50 persons engaged.

The city's economic development agency groups vehicle manufacturing and suppliers with mobility software and transport services in its industry profile.

=== Information technology and business services ===
Information and communication employed 111,264 socially insured workers in Munich in June 2025, representing 11.4 per cent of the city total. A separate municipal study of the information and communication technology (ICT) sector identified 100,344 socially insured employees in 2023, covering ICT manufacturing and wholesale as well as specialised services.

The ICT study reported 4,798 ICT businesses in Munich in 2022 and turnover of approximately €30.1 billion for that year. The study also documented employment growth across the ICT activities it defined between 2014 and 2023.

Professional, scientific and technical services and other business services together accounted for 225,748 employees subject to social security contributions on 30 June 2025, the largest grouping in the published breakdown.

=== Financial services and insurance ===
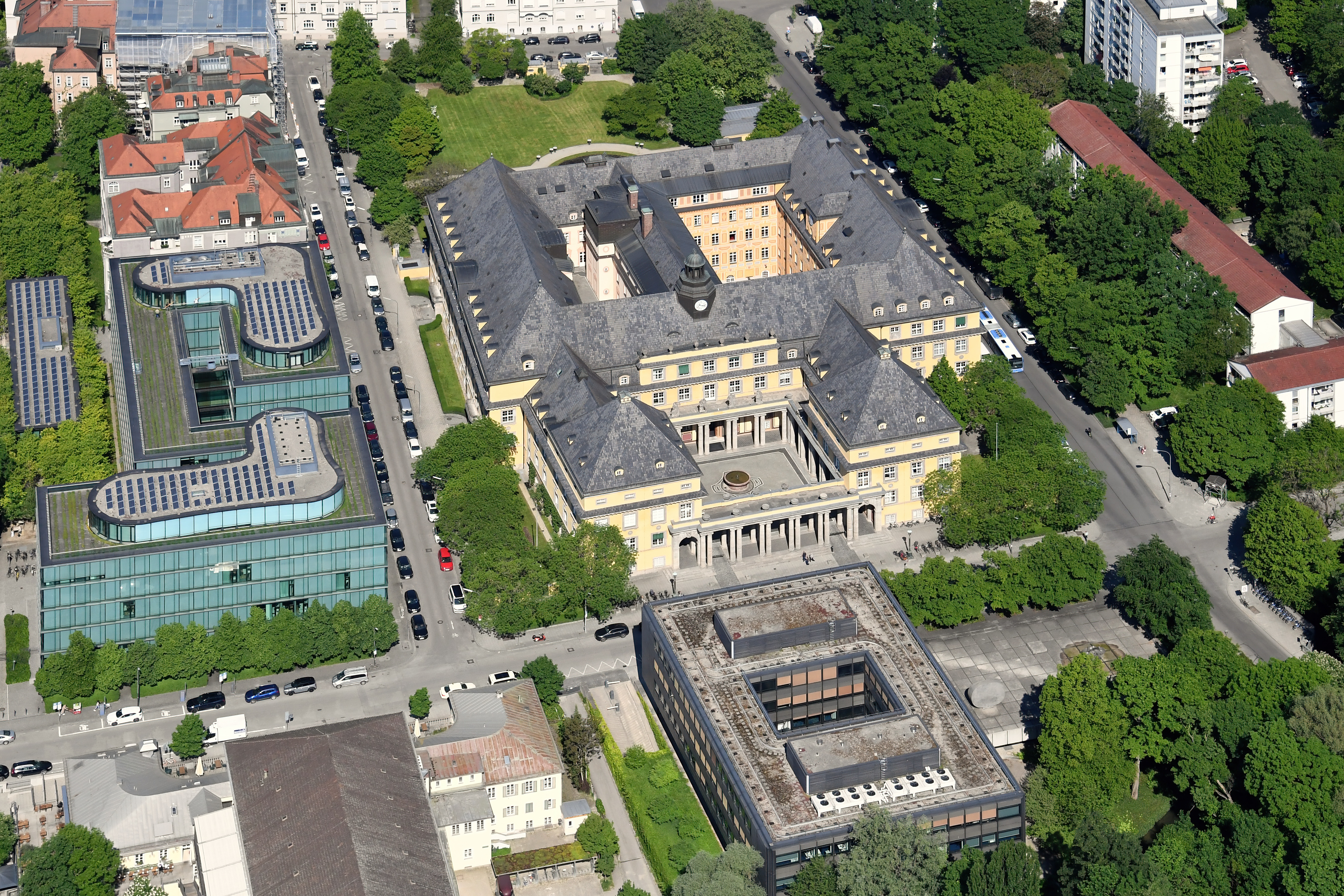
Munich Re's head office

Allianz has its registered office in Munich. Munich Re is also registered in Munich. Zademach and Musil distinguish Munich's concentration in insurance from Frankfurt's post-war development as Germany's main banking centre.

In an analysis of the changing geography of European finance, Zademach and Musil characterised Munich as a secondary centre in banking but a significant centre for insurance, tracing its development to long-standing relationships between local industry, insurers and financial institutions. Their study also identified a role for Munich in European private-equity networks.

On 30 June 2025, 61,636 employees subject to social security contributions worked in financial and insurance activities in Munich.

=== Media and the creative economy ===
The city reported 12,721 enterprises, 85,715 employees subject to social security contributions and €23.8 billion in turnover in Munich's cultural and creative industries in 2024. Its definition spans several fields, including software and games, advertising, publishing and audiovisual production.

=== Tourism, hospitality and trade fairs ===
The Messe München exhibition centre in Riem

Munich recorded 9,305,028 guest arrivals and 19,681,051 overnight stays in 2025 in accommodation establishments with at least ten guest beds and campsites with at least ten pitches. Overnight stays were slightly below the 2024 level, while arrivals were marginally higher.

The municipal statistical office identified the BAU, IAA Mobility and Oktoberfest among events that drew visitors to the city in 2025. The city estimates spending associated with Oktoberfest from projected spending on the festival grounds and spending by visitors from outside Munich elsewhere in the city. In a 2026 study commissioned by Messe München, the research consultancy Prognos estimated that events held on its exhibition grounds generated €2.33 billion in direct, indirect and induced turnover effects within Munich in a representative year of the 2024–25 exhibition cycle. The study used visitor and exhibitor surveys and a regional input–output model.

== Research, innovation and entrepreneurship ==
The city's higher education institutions include LMU Munich, the Technical University of Munich and the Munich University of Applied Sciences.

UnternehmerTUM and the university-linked Social Entrepreneurship Academy are among the organisations supporting entrepreneurs in the region. The regional network includes the BioM biotechnology cluster in Martinsried and aerospace facilities at the Ludwig-Bölkow-Campus in Taufkirchen.

In a qualitative study published in 2024, Sarah Herzog, Colin Mason and Michaela Hruskova found that local stakeholders saw large firms as a source of resources and opportunities for start-ups, while describing risk-averse corporate practices and barriers to collaboration.

The German Startup Association and startupdetector identified 19.3 new start-ups per 100,000 residents in Munich in 2025, compared with 16.8 in Berlin. The report identifies start-ups from commercial-register data using criteria for innovation or scalability.

The EY Startup-Barometer recorded €2.453 billion in venture-capital financing for Munich start-ups in 2025.

== Housing costs ==
A regional price index published by the German Economic Institute and the Federal Institute for Research on Building, Urban Affairs and Spatial Development put Munich's consumer prices almost 24 per cent above the German average in 2024. The researchers found that housing costs accounted for much of the variation in prices between regions.

The regional planning association found that Munich had the highest advertised flat prices in its study area in the fourth quarter of 2025. Asking rents in that quarter were highest in the city of Munich and the districts of Munich and Starnberg.

== See also ==
- Economy of Bavaria
- Munich Metropolitan Region
- History of Munich
