= Augsburg Decision =

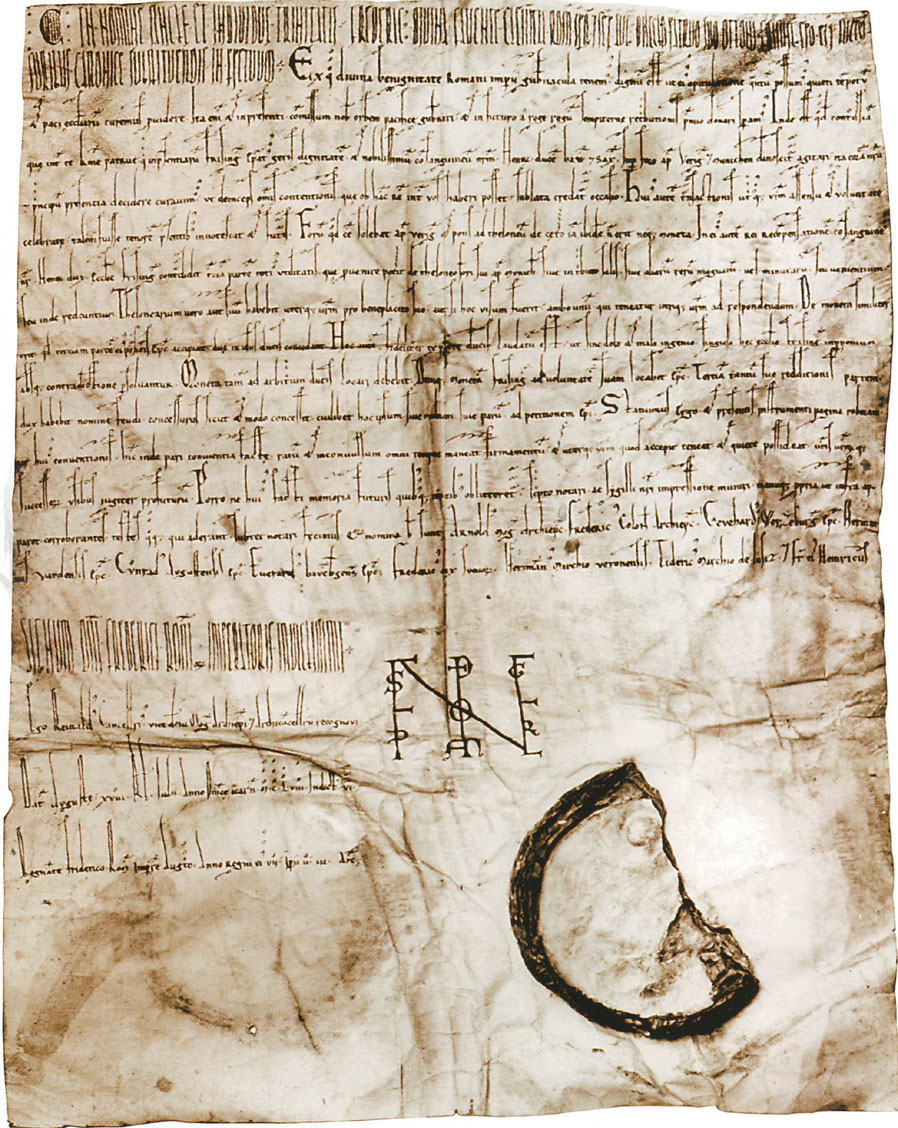
A 19th-century facsimile of the Augsburg Decision

The Augsburg Decision (German: Augsburger Schied) is an official document written by the Holy Roman Emperor Frederick Barbarossa on 14 June 1158 at the Diet of Augsburg. The original document is retained at the Bavarian State Archive.

The Augsburg Decision is notable for containing the earliest known reference to Munich, and is therefore misleadingly described as the city's founding document.

== Content ==
In this decision, Frederick granted Duke Henry the Lion, who was in a dispute with Bishop Otto of Freising, the right to operate a toll bridge over the Isar at the newly formed marketplace near "Munichen." Henry had previously demolished an episcopal bridge in Feringa (Oberföhring), thereby forcing the Berchtesgaden salt merchants traveling north and west to use his own bridge, located a few kilometres further south.

Frederick confirmed Munich's market and minting rights, while requiring that a third of the resulting revenue be paid to the Prince-Bishopric of Freising. These payments were made to Freising until 1803, and then to the state of Bavaria until 1852, when the obligation was lifted in exchange for a one-time transfer fee.

In the Regensburg Decision of 1180, Frederick rescinded the rights previously granted to Henry in favor of Freising.

== Name ==
Traditionally, the document is usually referred to in German as the Augsburger Schied, or "Augsburg Arbitration," suggesting that Frederick arbitrated between Henry and Otto. According to its wording, however, the document actually constitutes a decision (decidere curavimus). It arises from the text that Frederick confirmed an agreement (conventio) that Henry and Otto had made, and the document expresses the consent and will (utriusque vestrum assensu et voluntate) of both parties to that agreement. For this reason, the document is also referred to in more recent literature as the Augsburger Vergleich, or "Augsburg Settlement."

== Designation as Munich's founding document ==
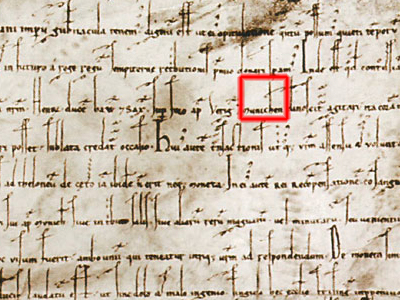
First documented reference to Munich (Munichen)

The Augsburg Decision is significant for the history of Munich, as it includes the first documented mention of the place name Munich (Munichen). For this reason, it is often called Munich's founding document by Munich historians. For example, at the end of the 19th century, a limited-edition folder was printed under this designation using collagraphy, which contained a facsimile of the document, its Latin text, and a German translation. A copy of this print can be seen in the Munich City Museum, whereas the original is stored in the Bavarian State Archive in Munich. A fragment of a seal can be seen in the facsimile; that seal fragment has been loosely enclosed with the original ever since it was restored.

However, this designation of founding document is incorrect in many respects. For one thing, the document did not establish Munich; rather, it mentions a preexisting marketplace for the first time. For another, the term civitas was not used for Munich until the 13th century; initially it was a forum, and then a villa. This means that Munich only gradually grew into a city. Moreover, the document talks of a "forum apud Munichen," or a marketplace near Munich. Hence, "Munichen" does not necessarily refer to Henry the Lion's new foundation, but could also refer to an already existing settlement in the vicinity of the newly established marketplace. For example, such a settlement is thought to have existed in a district outside Munich's first city wall, which received the name Altheim after the name Munich was transferred to the new site.

== Bibliography ==
- Appelt, Heinrich, ed. (1975). "DD F.I. 218". Monumenta Germaniae Historica: Die Urkunden der deutschen Koenige und Kaiser: Die Urkunden Friedrichs I. 1152–1158 [Historical Documents of Germany: The Documents of the German Kings and Emperors: The Documents of Frederick I., 1152–1158] (in German). Hanover: Hahnsche Buchhandlung. pp. 363–65. ISBN 3-7752-5121-9. OCLC 173829965.
- Bauer, Richard (2003). Geschichte Münchens: vom Mittelalter bis zur Gegenwart [History of Munich: From the Middle Ages to the Present] (in German). Munich: C. H. Beck. pp. 15–23. ISBN 3-406-51028-0. OCLC 52944301.
- City of Munich, ed. (November 2008). München wie geplant: Digitale Ausgabe des Katalogs zur Ausstellung im Münchner Stadtmuseum vom 6. Mai 2004 bis 17. Februar 2008 [Munich as planned: Digital Edition of the Catalog for the Exhibition in the Munich City Museum from 6 May 2004 to 17 February 2008] (in German). Munich. p. 20.
- Liess, Albrecht (1986). Aus 1200 Jahren. Das Bayerische Hauptstaatsarchiv zeigt seine Schätze [From 1,200 Years: The Bavarian State Archive Reveals Its Treasures]. Ausstellungskataloge der Staatlichen Archive Bayerns (in German). Vol. 11 (3rd ed.). Neustadt an der Aisch: Degener. pp. 66–67. ISBN 978-3-7686-9055-3. OCLC 22147595.
- Maier, Lorenz (1992). "Vom Markt zur Stadt. Herrschaftsinhaber und Führungsschichten 1158 bis 1294." [From the Marketplace to the City: Rulers and the Elite from 1158 to 1294]. In Bauer, Richard; Munich City Archive (eds.). Geschichte der Stadt München [History of the City of Munich] (in German). Munich: C. H. Beck. pp. 13–28. ISBN 3-406-35946-9. OCLC 26209494.
- Schaffer, Reinhold (1950). An der Wiege Münchens [At the Birthplace of Munich]. Stadtarchiv München (in German). Vol. 2. Munich: Pflaum. pp. 72–75. OCLC 6672705.
- Stahleder, Helmuth (2005). Bauer, Richard; Munich City Archive (eds.). Herzogs- und Bürgerstadt: Die Jahre 1157–1505 [Ducal and Citizen City: The Years 1157–1505]. Chronik der Stadt München (in German). Vol. 1. Munich: Dölling und Galitz. p. 7 f. ISBN 3-937904-10-7. OCLC 723184962.
- Stephan, Michael (2008). 'Forum Munichen'. Die kaiserliche Bestätigung der Münchner Marktgründung – 14. Juni 1158 ["Forum Munichen": The Imperial Confirmation of the Founding of the Munich Marketplace—14 June 1158]. Kleine Ausstellungen. Staatliche Archive Bayerns. (in German). Vol. 31. Munich. ISBN 978-3-938831-11-3. OCLC 644371686.
- Till, Wolfgang; Weidner, Thomas; Munich City Museum, eds. (2008). Typisch München!: das Jubiläumsbuch des Münchner Stadtmuseums [Typically Munich!: The Anniversary Book of the Munich City Museum] (in German). Munich: Edition Minerva. pp. 20–24. ISBN 978-3-938832-34-9. OCLC 232569669.
