= Municipal trade tax in Germany =

Municipal trade tax is levied as a trade income tax

Municipal trade tax

Federal law
- Territorial extent: Germany
- Enacted: 2002
- Commenced: 1 December 1936

Amends
- Art. 10 G of 16 December 2022
- Status: Current legislation

In Germany the municipal trade tax (German: Gewerbesteuer, GewSt) is levied as a trade income tax on the objective earning power of a business.

For this purpose a trade income is determined for municipal trade tax purposes, which regularly results in a municipal trade tax assessment amount of 3.5% of the trade income. The minimal municipal assessment rate is 200%, while the average is slightly above 400%.

Until 1997 the trade capital tax was used to tax the substance of a business, irrespective of its income. Since then, it has only been used in the profit additions, which include certain financing costs in the municipal trade tax assessment base. With the 2008 German corporate tax reform, this component was expanded to stabilize municipal trade tax revenue.

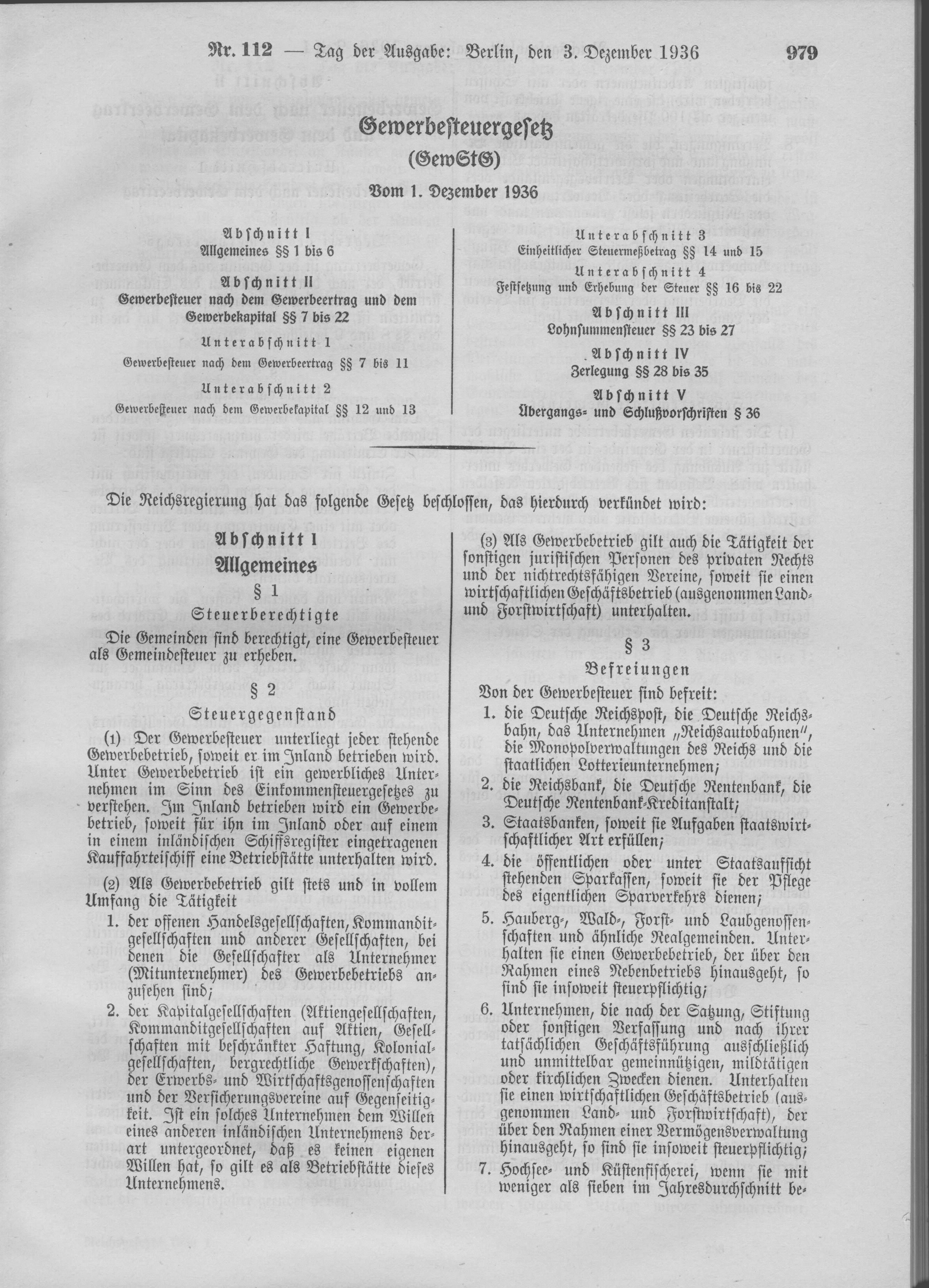
Municipal Trade Tax Act (GewStG) of 1 December 1936

The municipal trade tax is the most important original source of revenue for municipalities in Germany. According to Sec. 3 (2) of the German Fiscal Code, it is a real tax or property tax, even if this classification is disputed following the abolition of the trade capital tax and the payroll tax. Municipal trade tax is one of the municipal taxes and property taxes. The legal basis is the Municipal Trade Tax Act (GewStG), the Municipal Trade Tax Implementation Ordinance and, as general administrative regulations, the Trade Tax Guidelines.

== Equivalence principle ==
By paying taxes one does not acquire any entitlement to a specific state benefit (Sec. 3 para. 1 AO). Nevertheless, the municipal trade tax is often justified on the grounds that commercial enterprises should bear the burdens arising from their establishment and existence. In fact, no other tax has such a strong equivalence principle. It is levied according to a presumed cost causation. However, although the business tax is intended to refinance infrastructure measures and settlement burdens, its reason is not to compensate for tangible economic benefits.

== History of the municipal trade tax ==
The municipal trade tax was introduced in Prussia in 1891 by Miquel's tax reform.

The foundations for its current form were laid in the real tax reform of 1936; the Municipal Trade Tax Act dates from 1 December 1936. In addition to the trade income tax levied, trade capital and – via payroll tax – jobs were also taxed. Using different measurement figures, a municipal trade tax assessment amount was determined from the three different areas, to which the assessment rate was then applied.

In 1978 the payroll tax was initially abolished because of the associated negative employment policy consequences. The Accompanying Budget Law 1983 introduced a deduction restriction for interest on permanent debt for the first time. Originally, interest on permanent debt was fully deductible, i.e. interest payments did not reduce trade income. This was intended to ensure equal treatment of equity financing and debt financing, since (imputed) interest on equity also did not reduce the tax base. This claim was derived from the objective of taxing objective earning power. However, this was limited to 60% (from 1983) and 50% (from 1984) by amendment of the law.

The Act on the Continuation of the Corporate Tax Reform ended the trade capital tax as of 1998, so that the municipal trade tax has become a tax dependent only on earnings – which has led to increased cyclicality. As compensation, the municipalities received a share of the sales tax.

Until the 2007 assessment period, in addition to the addition of interest on permanent debt, half of the rental and leasing interest was also added if it was not already subject to municipal trade tax at the level of the recipient of the payments (usually the lessor). This was intended to avoid a double burden of municipal trade tax. However, due to the unequal treatment of German and foreign companies and the associated restriction of cross-border trade in services, the ECJ declared this provision to be contrary to EU criminal defenses in its Eurowings ruling.

The last major change came in 2008 with the Corporate Tax Reform Act. Among other things, this led to a new treatment of municipal trade tax in the determination of taxable income. As of 2008, this is no longer a operating expense in accordance with Sec. 4 para. 5b) of the German Income Tax Act (EStG) and is therefore not deductible. In addition, the scope of the addition of financing expenses has been significantly expanded. The broadening of the tax base and the elimination of the business expense deduction and the graduated tax rate are to be offset by lowering the municipal trade tax base and increasing the municipal trade tax credit at shareholder level.

== Taxation procedure ==
=== Subject of taxation ===
Taxes are levied on commercial enterprises that are recorded either via their legal form as a corporation or via their commercial activity as defined by income tax law (sole proprietorships and partnerships). An allowance of €24,500 is granted for individuals and partnerships (Sec. 11 para. 1 No. 1 GewStG). For other legal entities under private law (e.g. associations) and associations without legal capacity, insofar as they maintain a commercial business operation, an allowance of €5,000 applies (Sec. 11 para. 1 No. 2 GewStG). Freelance or other non-commercial self-employed activities as well as agricultural and forestry operations are not subject to municipal trade tax.

=== Assessment basis ===
The basis for calculating municipal trade tax is the trade income. This is the profit to be determined in accordance with income tax or corporation tax law. As a rule, the profit or loss is taken over and in individual cases increased (additions, Sec. 8 GewStG) or reduced (reductions, Sec. 9 GewStG) by certain amounts. Both additions and reductions pursue different objectives, which are partly justified by the fact that the assessment basis should reflect the objective earning power – real trade income independent of the entrepreneur's financing decision in the individual case – of a trade. According to the original conception of the legislator, an assumed fictitious standard business operates with its own capital, with its own machinery, but in third-party (rented) premises. However, the regulations on additions and reductions have changed several times, also for fiscal reasons, so that it remains controversial which additions or reductions can be justified with this objective.

Municipal trade tax calculation scheme: 
Profit from trade (profit) according to EStG or KStG 
+ additions 
– deductions 
---------------------------------------------------------------- 
= Trade income before loss deduction 
– Trade loss from previous years 
---------------------------------------------------------------- 
= Trade income (to be rounded down to full €100) 
– Tax allowance of €24,500 (only for sole proprietorships and partnerships) or €5.000 for other legal entities under private law (e.g. associations) as well as commercially active associations without legal capacity 
----------------------------------------------------------------- 
= trade income × tax rate (since 2008: 3.5%) 
----------------------------------------------------------------- 
= tax rate × assessment rate of the municipality 
----------------------------------------------------------------- 
= municipal trade tax to be determined 
– municipal trade tax prepayments 
= municipal trade tax payment burden

==== Additions ====
Since 2008 a quarter of the financing expenses has been added back to the profit. This also applies if the rental and lease payments are subject to municipal trade tax at the recipient of these payments. Financing expenses include payments for debts, pension payments and permanent charges, profit shares of silent partners and financing shares in rents, leases and licenses. These financing shares are determined on a lump-sum basis from the total consideration paid. With the extension of the regulation, the previously described EU illegality has been eliminated. In order to exclude small and medium-sized enterprises from the extension of the additions, an allowance of €200,000 (until 2019: €100,000) is provided for.

Additions:Interest and other consideration for debts (Sec. 8 No. 1a GewStG)

+ Pension payments and permanent charges (Sec. 8 No. 1b GewStG)

+ profit shares of silent partners (Sec. 8 No. 1c GewStG)

+ 20% of rents, leases and leasing rates for movable assets (Sec. 8 No. 1d GewStG)

+ 50% of rents, leases and leasing rates for immovable fixed assets (Sec. 8 No. 1e GewStG)

(reduced to 50% as of the 2010 assessment period)

+ 25% of the fees for the transfer of rights, concessions and licenses (Sec. 8 No. 1f GewStG)

= Total amount of financing fees

– Allowance of €200,000

==== Interim balance ====
× 25%

= Total amount of additions from finance charges

In addition to financing expenses, other items are added back to profit: Profit shares distributed to personally liable partners of a KGaA (Sec. 8 No. 4 GewStG), dividends previously exempted from tax under the provisions of the partial income procedure (Sec. 8 No. 5 GewStG), shares in the losses of a domestic or foreign commercial partnership (Sec. 8 No. 8 GewStG), contributions to promote tax-privileged purposes (Sec. 8 No. 9 GewStG), and certain partial write-downs and losses on disposals (Sec. 8 No. 10 GewStG).

==== Reduction ====
The reductions are intended to avoid multiple charges of real taxes. For example, the trade income is reduced by a portion of the standard value of business real estate, as this is already subject to real estate tax. In addition, profit shares from qualified participations (more than a 15% share) are reduced, as these are already subject to municipal trade tax at the level of the distributing corporation (so-called trade tax intercoporate privilege). In addition, foreign profit shares are reduced to take account of the domestic nature of the municipal trade tax.

Reductions:

1.2% of the unit value of the real estate belonging to the business assets (Sec. 9 No. 1 Sentence 1 GewStG).

+ Profit shares from a foreign or domestic co-partnership (Sec. 9 No. 2 GewStG)

+ Dividends from a domestic corporation, provided that the shareholding is at least 15% (Sec. 9 No. 2a GewStG)

+ Trade income of a foreign permanent establishment within the meaning of Sec. 12 AO (Sec. 9 No. 3 GewStG)

+ donations for the promotion of tax-privileged purposes within the maximum amounts (Sec. 9 No. 5 GewStG)

+ dividends from a foreign corporation, provided that it holds an interest of at least 15% (Sec. 9 No. 7 GewStG)

+ certain dividends from a foreign corporation, subject to double tax agreement (Sec. 9 No. 8 GewStG)

==== Extended reduction ====
Housing companies (corporation or cooperative) and other property-managing companies can take advantage of the so-called extended municipal trade tax reduction (provisions of Sec. 9 No. 1 sentence 2 GewStG). The extended reduction was introduced in order not to place housing companies in a worse position than private individuals or property-managing partnerships whose income from renting and leasing is not subject to municipal trade tax. In addition to the income from the management and use of the company's own real estate, only the company's own capital assets may be managed and used, single-family houses, two-family houses or condominiums may be built and sold, and residential buildings may be managed as a secondary activity. Since the assessment year 2021, income from the supply of electricity in connection with the operation of renewable energy systems within the meaning of Sec. 3 No. 21 EEG (main application case the operation of photovoltaic systems) or from the operation of charging stations for electric vehicles or electric bicycles does not lead to the denial of the extended property reduction if this income in the fiscal year does not exceed 10 percent of the income from the transfer of use of the real property, cf. Sec. 9 No. 1 sentence 3 let. b) GewStG. The prerequisite is that the income from the supply of electricity with the operation of plants for the generation of electricity from renewable energies within the meaning of Sec. 3 No. 21 EEG does not come from the supply to end consumers, unless these are tenants of the plant operator. Furthermore, Sec. 9 No. 1 sentence 3 let. c) GewStG also introduced a general de minimis limit of 5 percent of the income from the transfer of use of the real property for service relationships with the tenants of the real property.

=== Determination of the measurement amount ===
Based on the trade income of the company, a tax assessment amount is determined, the municipal trade tax assessment amount. This is determined by the tax office by issuing a municipal trade tax assessment notice (basic notice for municipal trade tax).

- The trade income is rounded down to a full €100 (Sec. 11 para. 1 GewStG)
- Deduction of an allowance
  - for natural persons (commercial sole proprietorships) and partnerships: €24,500 (Sec. 11 para. 1 No. 1 GewStG)
  - for associations and legal entities under public law: €5,000 (Sec. 11 para. 1 no. 2 GewStG)
  - Corporations do not receive an allowance
- The result is the reduced trade income
- Multiplication of the reduced trade income with the tax rate
  - Since the 2008 corporate tax reform, the uniform tax rate for all companies has been 3.5% (Sec. 11 (2) GewStG).

=== Calculation of the taxable amount ===
==== Example 1 Sole proprietorship/individual enterprise ====
Trade income €100,550 
Trade income €100,500  (rounded down to full €100 )
– Tax exempt amount €24.500 
--------------------------
= Trade income €76,000

€76,000  × tax rate 3.5% = measured amount €2,660

==== Example 2 Corporation ====
Trade income €100,000  (no tax exempt amount)

€100,000  × tax rate 3.5% = measurement amount €3,500 

The 2008 corporate tax reform abolished the graduated tax rate for sole proprietorships and partnerships that had applied until then.

=== Determination and apportionment of municipal trade tax ===
The assessment rate is determined by the municipality.

Example as above:
Measurement amount × assessment rate = municipal trade tax
€2.660  × 400% = €10.640 

The right to set the assessment rate (or another "economic strength-related tax" to be newly created) is guaranteed to the municipalities by the Basic Law. In the city states of Berlin and Hamburg, the municipal and state levels are identical. Municipal trade tax is therefore assessed there by the tax offices, while in the rest of Germany it is assessed by the municipalities. This also applies to the state of Bremen, which has a special city-state status here, as it is made up of the municipalities of Bremen and Bremerhaven and must therefore be separated between the state and municipal levels.

Since 2004, the assessment rate has been at least 200% in accordance with Sec. 16 (4) Sentence 2 GewStG. In this way, the legislator aims to prevent so-called municipal trade tax havens (e.g. Norderfriedrichskoog, which for a long time had an assessment rate of zero). In most cases, the assessment rates of large cities are higher than in the surrounding areas. For example, Munich has an assessment rate of 490%, while the municipalities in the surrounding areas have rates between 240% and 360%.

By setting the assessment rate, the municipality has a political framework in its hands for attracting or, if necessary, discouraging commercial enterprises. A low assessment rate is one of several decision-making criteria for the location question. Although a low tax rate is a positive criterion for attracting businesses, it is associated with lower tax revenues per paying company for the municipality. High assessment rates can lead to migration tendencies, but also result in higher tax revenues per individual company. Finding the right balance for the respective municipality is left to the skill of the political actors.

If the company has permanent establishments in several municipalities or if the permanent establishment extends over the territory of several municipalities ("multi-municipal permanent establishment"), the tax assessment amount must be distributed among the individual municipalities (apportionment, Sec. 28 et seq. GewStG; tax apportionment). However, this does not apply to railroad tracks, pipelines (e.g. for gas, water, electrical energy) and underground mining facilities. As a rule, the decomposition is based on the ratio of wages paid to employees in the individual municipalities (Sec. 29 GewStG). In the case of a multi-municipal permanent establishment, the municipal trade tax is to be apportioned according to the local situation, taking into account the municipal burdens arising from the existence of the permanent establishment (Sec. 30 GewStG). These can be, for example, criteria such as the respective facilities located in the area of a municipality and/or the operating income generated there. An apportionment also takes place if a permanent establishment is relocated to another municipality during the year, so that different assessment rates may have to be applied for the corresponding periods. In such a case, each municipality concerned issues its own municipal trade tax assessment for the respective period. The responsible tax office issues an assessment notice on the apportionment.

== Relations with other taxes ==
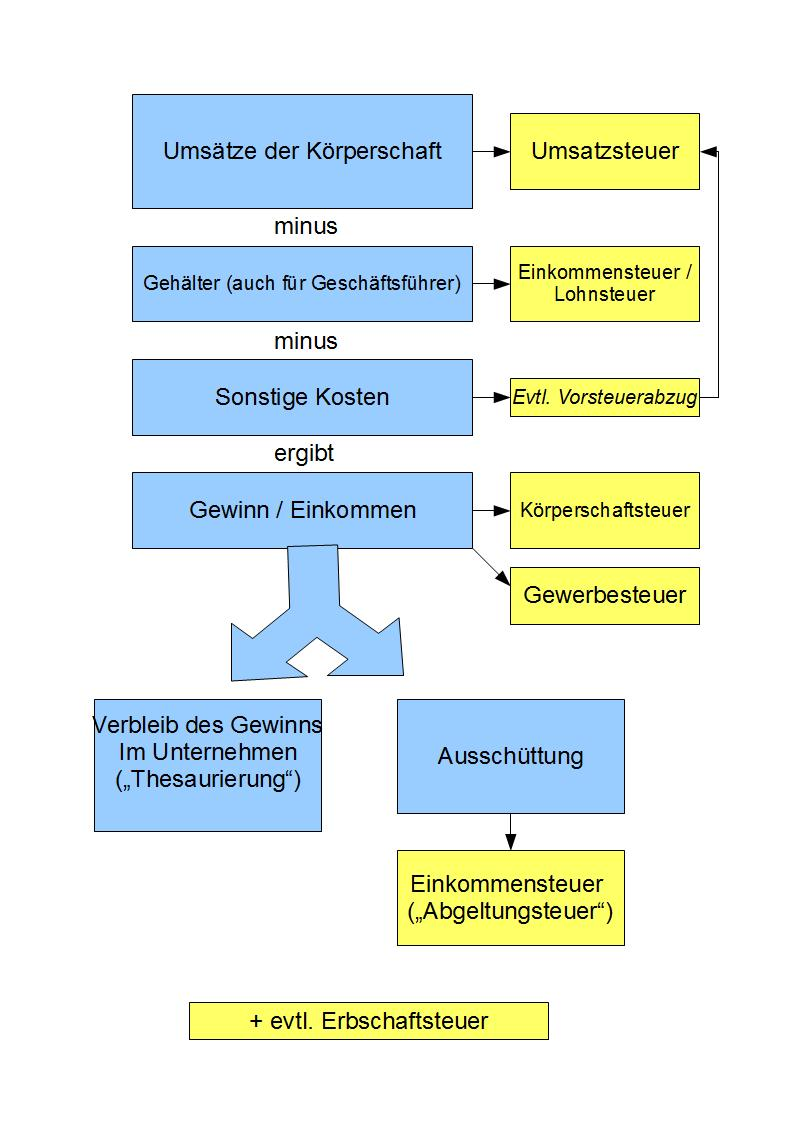
Simplified illustration of the different types of taxes for a company

The 2008 corporate tax reform abolished the business expense deduction for municipal trade tax for collection periods ending after 31 December 2007. Municipal trade tax is a non-deductible operating expense for tax purposes (Sec. 4 para. 5b) of the German Income Tax Act (EStG)).

Since assessment period (VZ) 2001, sole proprietors and partners in a partnership have been able to offset municipal trade tax against their income tax (Sec. 35 EStG). The credit is made by deducting 4 times (from 2008 to 2019 3.8 times; until 2007 1.8 times) the municipal trade tax assessment amount from the standard income tax and is limited to the income tax attributable to the income from trade. The upper limit is the municipal trade tax actually paid. Municipal trade tax thus only becomes an actual burden for sole proprietors and partnerships if the assessment rate exceeds approx. 420% (approx. 400% from 2008 to 2019; approx. 180% until 2007).

Since assessment period (VZ) 2001, sole proprietors and partners in a partnership have been able to offset municipal trade tax against their income tax (Sec. 35 EStG). The credit is made by deducting 4 times (from 2008 to 2019 3.8 times; until 2007 1.8 times) the municipal trade tax assessment amount from the standard income tax and is limited to the income tax attributable to the income from trade. The upper limit is the municipal trade tax actually paid. Municipal trade tax thus only becomes an actual burden for sole proprietors and partnerships if the assessment rate exceeds approx. 420% (approx. 400% from 2008 to 2019; approx. 180% until 2007).

== Financial significance of the municipal trade tax ==
In 2014 municipal trade tax revenues nationwide amounted to around 43.8 billion euros. For municipalities, municipal trade tax is the only significant source of revenue, apart from property tax, that they can influence. It is protected by the guarantee of self-government under Article 28 (2) of the Basic Law. The municipal trade tax (net) covered around 15% of adjusted revenues on average in Germany in 2014. The municipalities must transfer part of the municipal trade tax revenue to the federal and state governments as a municipal trade tax levy. The amount of this municipal trade tax levy changes very frequently; after 1990, almost annually. It is significantly higher for the West German municipalities, as they participate in the costs of the German Unity Fund through this. In 2014, the national average was 25%. Since municipal trade tax is directly related to local economic strength, there are clear and lasting differences, especially in the west–east comparison. For example, the per capita revenue of the municipalities in the Dingolfing-Landau district, adjusted for the levy rate, is more than 24 times higher than that of the municipalities in the Kusel district (€121) at €2,945. In the new federal states, municipal trade tax is fundamentally less important. To compensate for their lower tax power, they will continue to receive special needs allocations from the federal government until 2019 as part of the Solidarity Pact. From a fiscal point of view, the municipal trade tax has two disadvantages for municipalities. Since it depends directly on local economic strength, it is spatially and intermunicipally concentrated. Some economically strong cities, such as Frankfurt am Main, Ingolstadt or Verl, depend on it. In other cities, it plays practically no role. The calculation method results in a high volatility of the revenue over time. In the wake of the economic crisis in 2009, for example, revenue plummeted by more than 20%. Subsequently, the revenue rose again by 35% within five years. The strong dependence of the municipal trade tax on economic performance and its high volatility are the central cause of the persistent and growing differences in the tax power of the municipalities.

=== Based on the trade income of the company, a tax assessment amount is determined, the municipal trade tax assessment amount. ===
| Federal state | Municipal trade tax revenue 2010 in € million | Per capita municipal trade tax revenue 2010 in €/ew. | Municipal trade tax capacity 2010 at assessment rate of 100% in €/eur. | Weighted average collection rate 2010 |
|---|---|---|---|---|
| * Germany | 35.737 | 437,15 | 111,99 | 390% |
| Baden-Württemberg | 4.733 | 440,24 | 123,04 | 358% |
| Baviera | 6.247 | 498,97 | 135,44 | 368% |
| Berlin | 1.224 | 355,26 | 86,65 | 410% |
| Brandenburg | 641 | 255,54 | 82,82 | 309% |
| Bremen | 314 | 475,63 | 109,52 | 434% |
| Hamburg | 1.710 | 961,11 | 204,49 | 470% |
| Hesse | 3.635 | 599,49 | 153,45 | 391% |
| Mecklenburg-West Pomerania | 317 | 192,55 | 55,88 | 345% |
| Lower Saxony | 3.049 | 384,37 | 100,41 | 383% |
| North Rhine-Westphalia | 8.959 | 501,88 | 115,05 | 436% |
| Rhineland-Palatinate | 1.464 | 365,39 | 99,64 | 367% |
| Saarland | 347 | 340,56 | 83,44 | 408% |
| Saxony | 1.165 | 280,58 | 68,08 | 412% |
| Saxony-Anhalt | 554 | 236,20 | 67,57 | 350% |
| Schleswig-Holstein | 906 | 320,13 | 92,28 | 347% |
| Thuringia | 473 | 210,87 | 60,40 | 349% |

Source: Federal Statistical Office Fachserie 14 Reihe 10.1 – 2010

=== Municipal trade tax levy ===
The municipalities are entitled to the municipal trade tax revenue. However, the federal and state governments also indirectly participate in the municipal trade tax through the municipal trade tax levy.

=== Known cities and municipalities with their historically highest tax rates ===
| City | Historical Highest collection rate | Status 2017 |
|---|---|---|
| Oberhausen | 550 | 550 |
| Duisburg | 520 | 520 |
| Frankfurt | 515 | 460 |
| Leverkusen | 500 | 475 |
| Bonn | 490 | 490 |
| Munich | 490 | 490 |
| Essen | 480 | 480 |
| Hanover | 480 | 480 |
| Cologne | 475 | 475 |
| Hamburg | 470 | 470 |
| Leipzig | 460 | 460 |
| Düsseldorf | 460 | 440 |
| Hamelin | 460 | 455 |
| Dresden | 450 | 450 |
| Magdeburg | 450 | 450 |
| Nuremberg | 447 | 447 |
| Stuttgart | 445 | 420 |
| Karlsruhe | 430 | 430 |
| Berlin | 410 | 410 |

=== Municipalities with the historically lowest assessment rate ===
| City | Historic lowest collection rate | at 1 July 2010 |
|---|---|---|
| Beiersdorf-Freudenberg | 0 | 200 |
| Kremmen | 0 | 200 |
| Liebenwalde | 0 | 200 |
| Norderfriedrichskoog | 0 | 200 |
| Schönefeld | 200 | 200 |
| Zossen | 200 | 200 |

According to a survey by the Association of German Chambers of Commerce and Industry (DIHK), the average assessment rate in the largest municipalities was 435% in 2010. Record holders among municipalities with 50,000 or more inhabitants are Munich, Bottrop, Duisburg and Oberhausen, each with 490%; the lowest rates in this group are charged by Bad Homburg vor der Höhe, Friedrichshafen, Frankfurt (Oder), Lingen, Neu-Ulm and Waiblingen, each with 350%. Among the small municipalities, around 100 municipalities or parts of municipalities charge only the minimum collection rate of 200%. The front-runner is the Eifel village of Dierfeld, which has been charging 900% for years. While German cities have tended to increase their municipal trade tax collection rate in recent years, for example, Duisburg has seen a gradual increase from 470% to 520% from 2003 to 2016, the city of Monheim am Rhein has seen a gradual decrease in its municipal trade tax collection rate from 435% (2010) to the lowest rate of any city in North Rhine-Westphalia of 250% (2018). The city of Monheim am Rhein has seen a gradual decrease in its municipal trade tax collection rate from 435% (2010) to 250% (2018).

== Discussion of the municipal trade tax ==
The municipal trade tax is one of the most controversial German taxes. Time and again, constitutional concerns have been raised against the municipal trade tax, since liberal professions in particular are not subject to municipal trade tax. However, these concerns were not shared by the Federal Fiscal Court and the Federal Constitutional Court. A detailed submission by the Lower Saxony Fiscal Court, in which it explained in 60 pages why the municipal trade tax violated the principle of equality before the law, was rejected by the Federal Constitutional Court (Ref. 1 BvL 2/04).

=== Opposing positions of the municipalities and the companies ===
For the municipalities, the municipal trade tax is the most important independent source of tax revenue, but at the same time it is highly dependent on the business cycle, so that the municipalities cannot plan on steady revenues. (From 1998 to 1999, municipal trade tax revenue changed by +20% in Hamburg, but by −36% in Kiel, +100% in Schweinfurt, +230% in Werdau and −60% in Leverkusen). Another criticism is that the assessment rate cannot be used by the municipalities to attract new businesses by lowering it, but that, conversely, municipalities that are already disadvantaged are forced to maintain a high (deterrent) assessment rate and thus lose even more businesses to municipalities that are already rich; the assessment rate differential between the big city and the surrounding area is criticized in particular. Since the municipal trade tax is a German peculiarity and represents an additional burden on business income, it is criticized that the municipal trade tax has a negative effect on international location competition.

The media report on companies that would no longer pay municipal trade tax at all: among them the (now) world's largest food company Unilever: by restructuring the group by means of a subsidiary ("Monda Beteiligungs GmbH"), which was located in a barn in Norderfriedrichskoog (see below), Dietstraat 13, no municipal trade tax at all was due for years. Up to 500 subsidiaries of international companies had their headquarters in Norderfriedrichskoog. According to the Frankfurter Rundschau (29 January 2002, sec. cit.), profits are booked at the foreign subsidiaries, while losses are located in Germany: In 2001, Bayer AG had paid no municipal trade tax, although it had reported profits of over 800 million euros. This had severely impacted the budgets of affected cities. This tax-saving model has since been eliminated by legislative measures.

To conclude from this that large companies generally avoid paying municipal trade tax would be too sweeping and cannot be substantiated by the empirical data. It is true that individual companies pay little or no municipal trade tax, sometimes over a period of years, but large companies in particular make a significant contribution to municipal trade tax revenues. In 1995, for example, the largest 136 companies (companies with a trade income > DM 100 million) contributed almost 18% to municipal trade tax revenue, although they account for less than 0.015% of taxpayers. If we add the companies with a trade income between DM 50 and 100 million, 0.036% of the companies paid a quarter (25%) of the total municipal trade tax, whereas the 80% of smaller companies paid only 6%. However, it is precisely this dependence of municipalities on large companies in which many critics see a danger of municipalities becoming "susceptible to blackmail"; moreover, the crisis of a large company often leads to a dramatic crisis in the financial situation of the affected municipalities (see cyclical dependence above).

The assertion that the municipal trade tax group in particular leads to a reduction of the tax burden to zero also misses the point. For municipal trade tax purposes, a fiscal unity means that the individual companies in the fiscal group are treated as permanent establishments and can offset profits and losses against each other. Of course, this makes it possible to reduce the tax burden to zero, but not only the company benefits from this, but above all the municipality in which the loss-making part of the company is located, since the other municipalities also share in the loss. The tax group thus primarily ensures a more even distribution among the various municipalities in which a group is located. Since the various affiliated companies are treated as permanent establishments, the total trade income of the fiscal unity is distributed among the individual municipalities essentially according to payroll. Thus, if the entire group shows a positive result, all municipalities receive municipal trade tax, those with highly profitable parts of the company less than without the tax group, those with loss-making parts more. Even if the entire fiscal unity manages to turn around after a loss-making phase, individual municipalities are not disadvantaged for a very long time by existing loss carryforward compared to the municipalities with the profitable parts of the company, but they receive tax revenues again more quickly.

Since the municipal trade tax represents a considerable burden for companies, but at the same time is of great importance for municipalities, reforms in this area have often met with resistance due to the various interests involved, yet the municipal trade tax has been under discussion for decades.

=== Municipal trade tax in international comparison ===
- Austria abolished its municipal trade tax in 1994, but has since levied a municipal tax of 3% on payroll.
- Switzerland does not levy a municipal trade tax. Exceptions are regulated on a cantonal basis; for example, the municipalities in the canton of Geneva levy a municipal trade tax comparable to that in Germany.
- In Luxembourg, a tax similar to the German municipal trade tax (impôt commercial) is levied, for which the municipalities also have a right of assessment.
- France levies local taxes (contribution économique territoriale (CET)), which tax the value added and real estate ownership of companies; these replace the non-income-based taxe professionelle, which was in force until 2010.
- Spain levies the impuesto sobre actividades economicas, which is a municipal tax and is also non-profit, although companies whose net sales do not exceed €1 million are exempt [artículo 82 del Texto refundido de la Ley Reguladora de las Haciendas Locales].
- Italy levies a regional tax, the imposta regionale sulle attività produttive, which taxes the value added by companies. The municipalities are given the option of adjusting the tax rate of 4.25% up or down by one percentage point. It was considered very likely that this tax, called IRAP, would contradict the 6th EC Directive, according to which no similar taxes may be levied in addition to the harmonized VAT. In his opinion, Advocate General Jacobs argued for a ban of the tax, but because of the expected enormous tax reclaims (estimated at 120 billion euros) in the event of an ex tunc effect of the judgment, as is usual for ECJ judgments, he also argued for a limitation of the effect of the judgment to a point in the future. In the end, however, the ECJ decided otherwise – that IRAP complied with European law.
- Like Italy (see above), Hungary levies a tax similar to the municipal trade tax. In the course of the pending proceedings against Italy at the ECJ, this tax has increasingly come under public discussion. Following the aforementioned decision of the ECJ, however, the Hungarian government announced its intention to continue to apply this type of tax.
- In the US, many local authorities levy a non-income-related tax on the fixed assets of commercial operations (commercial property tax). Generally, state law establishes a rate and local governments establish rates, with overlapping local governments (e.g., county, municipality, sewer district, and school district) imposing their rates side by side.

If the 25% corporate tax (including solidarity surcharge 26.375%) was considered until 2007, Germany would have been in the middle of the pack in an international comparison. But due to the municipal trade tax, which leads to an additional burden of 15 to 20% – depending on the assessment rate – Germany was at the top of the tax burden on corporate profits for corporations. On 1 January 2008 a corporate tax reform came into force in which the corporate income tax was reduced to 15%, putting Germany back in the middle of the European field in nominal terms as well. See also corporate taxation.

=== Reform proposals ===
There have always been efforts to reform the municipal trade tax or abolish it altogether. In 2002, in view of the financial situation of the municipalities, the German government set up a commission to reform municipal taxes, whose working group on "Municipal Taxes" examined, among other things, replacing the municipal trade tax with a proportional surcharge on other taxes. In 2003 the German government passed a bill to reform the municipal trade tax with a further development of the municipal trade tax into a municipal business tax including the liberal professions. The bill failed due to opposition from the Bundesrat.

In 2010 the federal cabinet set up a municipal finance commission with the task of drawing up proposals for restructuring municipal financing. In particular, it was to examine "the revenue-neutral replacement of the municipal trade tax with a higher share of the value-added tax and a municipal surcharge on income and corporate income tax with its own assessment rate". After 15 months of negotiations, however, the commission made no recommendation for municipal trade tax reform at its final meeting on 15 June 2011.

While the municipalities are calling for the municipal trade tax to be retained or strengthened by expanding non-income components or extending the group of taxpayers to include freelancers and landlords, the business side is calling for the municipal trade tax to be abolished. As an alternative, an increase in the municipalities' right to levy income tax and corporate income tax or an increase in their share of sales tax are proposed. But there are also other proposals, such as the introduction of a value-added tax.

== Bibliography ==
- RP Richter & Partner: Gewerbesteuer. Wiesbaden 2008, ISBN 978-3-8349-0696-0.
- Jens Demmig: Die Gewerbesteuer im internationalen Vergleich. Institut "Finanzen und Steuern", Brief 306. Bonn 1992.
- Otto H. Jacobs: Internationale Unternehmensbesteuerung. 5. Auflage. C. H. Beck, München 2002, ISBN 3-406-48657-6.
- Hanns Karrenberg, Engelbert Münstermann: Gemeindefinanzbericht 2000. Städte im Griff von EU, Bund und Ländern. In: der städtetag. Heymann, Köln 4.2000, ISSN 0038-9048, S. 4–99.
- Statistisches Bundesamt: Statistisches Jahrbuch 2001. Wiesbaden 2001.
- Heribert Zitzelsberger: Grundlagen der Gewerbesteuer, eine steuergeschichtliche, rechtsvergleichende, steuersystematische und verfassungsrechtliche Untersuchung. Habilitations-Schrift Univ. Regensburg 1989. Otto Schmidt, Köln 1990, ISBN 3-504-25105-0.
- Bob Neubert, Tobias Plenk: Einfluss der Unternehmensteuerreform 2008 auf die Rechtsformwahl von Unternehmen. In: Steuern und Studium. 2008, S. 37–44.
- Niels-Frithjof Henckel: Reformoptionen einer kommunalen Wirtschaftsbesteuerung, Trier 2004, ISBN 3-925851-85-2.
- Volker Karthaus, Oliver Sternkiker: Gewerbesteuer Handausgabe 2010. Stollfuß Medien, Bonn 2010, ISBN 978-3-08-182600-4.
- Achim Bergemann (Hrsg.), Jörg Wingler (Hrsg.): Gewerbesteuer – GewStG. Kommentar. 1. Auflage. Gabler, Wiesbaden 2010, ISBN 978-3-8349-2296-0.
