= History of the Jews in Munich =

The history of the Jews in Munich, Germany, dates back to the beginning of the 13th century. An early written reference to a Jewish presence in Munich is dated 1229, when Abraham de Munichen acted as a witness to the sale of a house in Ratisbon.

== History ==
In 1210, Ludwig I, Duke of Bavaria, permitted the Jews to build a synagogue and to acquire a cemetery in 1225. The Jews’ street soon developed into a ghetto, beyond which the Jews were not permitted to live until 1440; the ghetto contained, besides the synagogue, a communal house, a ritual bath, a slaughter-house, and a hospital.

By the second half of the thirteenth century, the community had increased to 200. Bavarian Jews had loaned money to Otto I, Duke of Bavaria, around 1180 to build Landshuth, and received in return special privileges, which were confirmed by Ludwig I, who in 1230 granted them the right to elect the so-called “Jews’ judge.”

A pogrom after "a Christian child was found dead and many Jews were killed as revenge" in 1286 is commemorated by two memorial dirges (Kinnot) printed in "Gezerot Ashkenaz Vetzarfat," Haberman, 1956 and described in "Das Martyrologium des Nurnberger Memorbuches" Salfield, 1898

However, in 1442 Jews were excluded from Upper Bavaria, including Munich.

Jews only settled back in Munich at the end of the 18th century (53 in 1781, 127 in 1790). The Jewish population is estimated at around 3,500-4,000 in 1875 and around 11,000 in 1910 after the immigration of Eastern Jews following the outbreak of pogroms in Russia. By 1910, 20% of Bavaria's Jews (approximately 11,000 people) lived in the Bavarian capital.

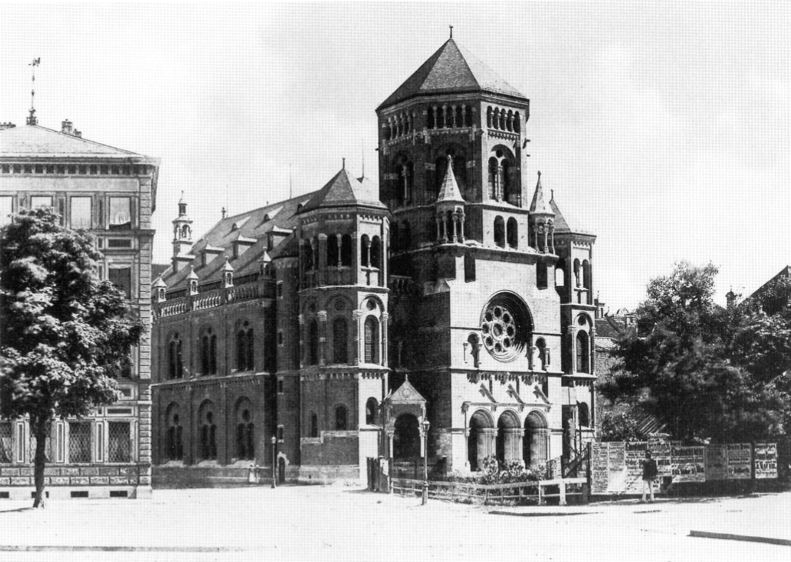
Old Great Synagogue of Munich. Built between 1883 and 1887, it was destroyed by the Nazis in 1938

By the time the Nazis rose to national power in 1933, there were about 9,000-10,000 Jews in Munich. By May 1938, about 3,500 Jews had emigrated, ca. 3,100 of them moving abroad. By May 1939, the number of Jews in the city had further declined to 5,000. In 1944, only 7 Jews remained in Munich. During the war, about 3,000 Jews were deported, with only about 300 returning after the war.

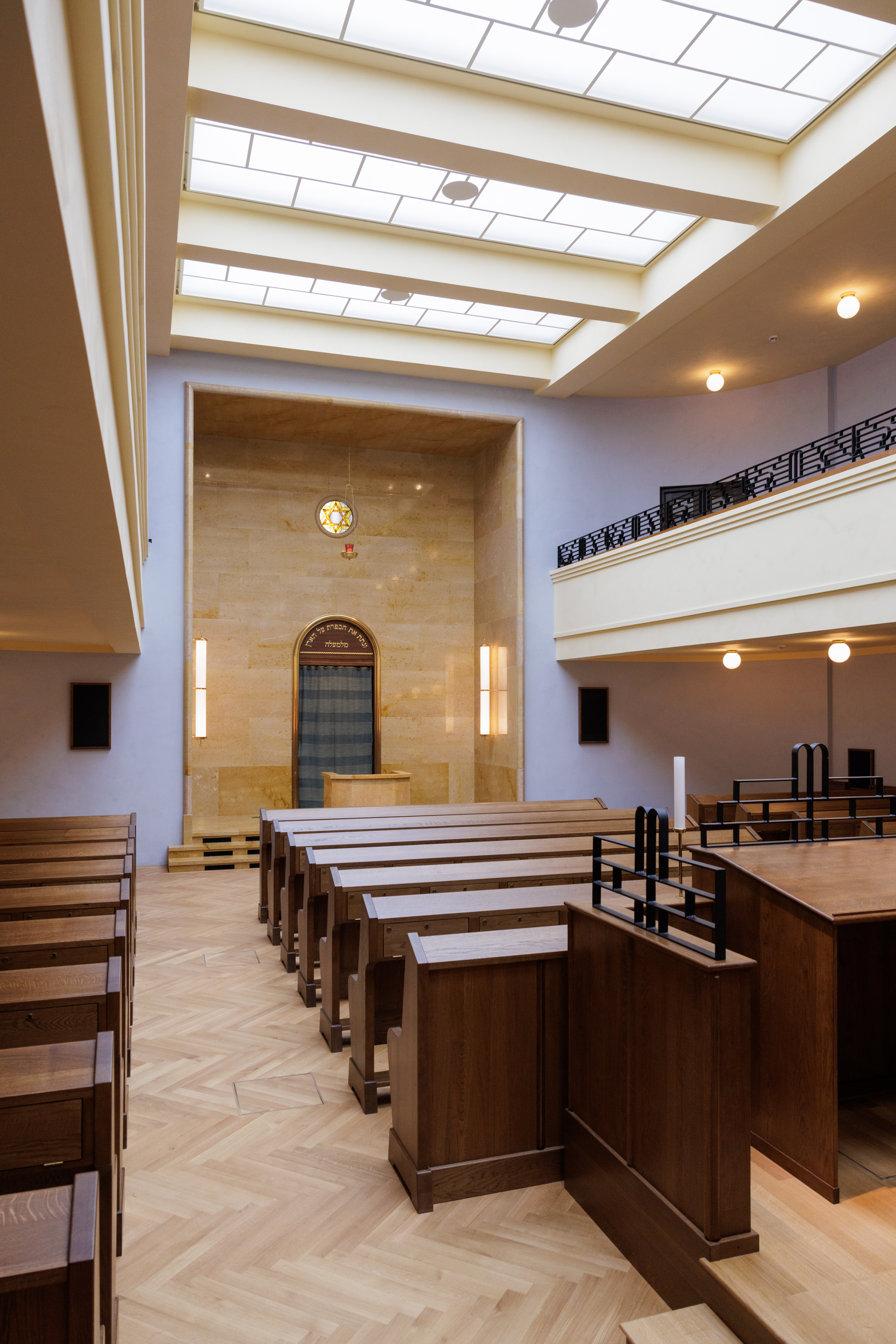
Interior of newly restored Reichenbachstraße Synagogue

A new community was founded in 1945, which had grown to about 3,500 by 1970. Following the emigration of Jews from the former Soviet Union after 1990, the Jewish population in Munich numbered 5,000 in 1995 and is estimated today to around 9,000, making it the second largest Jewish community in Germany after Berlin.
