= Norderfriedrichskoog =

Norderfriedrichskoog Nørre Frederikskog
- Municipality
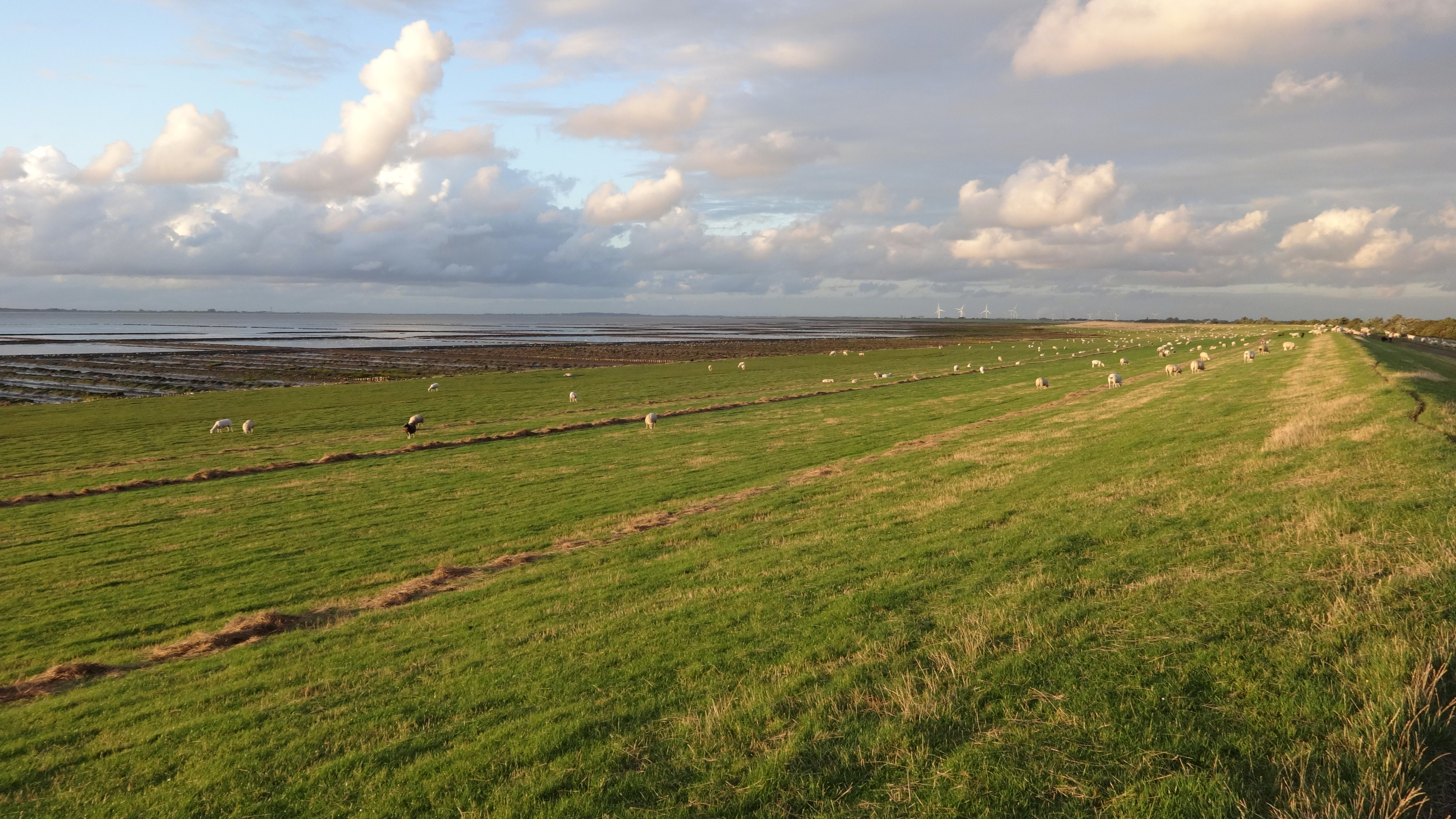

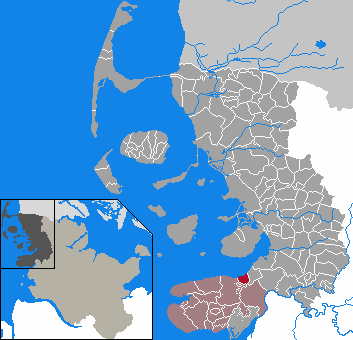
- Location of Norderfriedrichskoog; Nørre Frederikskog within Nordfriesland district
- Interactive map of Norderfriedrichskoog; Nørre Frederikskog
- Location within Germany Location within Schleswig-Holstein
- Coordinates: 54°24′N 8°54′E
- Country: Germany
- State: Schleswig-Holstein
- District: Nordfriesland

Government
  - Mayor: Jann Henning Dircks

Area
  - Total: 5.31 km^{2} (2.05 sq mi)
- Elevation: 0 m (0 ft)

Population (2025-12-31)
  - Total: 46
  - Density: 8.7/km^{2} (22/sq mi)
- Time zone: UTC+01:00 (CET)
  - Summer (DST): UTC+02:00 (CEST)
- Postal codes: 25870
- Dialling codes: 04864
- Vehicle registration: NF

Norderfriedrichskoog (Danish: Nørre Frederikskog) is a municipality in the district of Nordfriesland, in Schleswig-Holstein, Germany.

== Former tax haven ==
In the 1990s, Norderfriedrichskoog became a popular 0% tax haven, and by 2003 the village, with a population of only 47, was home to over 500 companies, including Deutsche Bank, Eli Lilly and Company, Unilever, Lufthansa and E.On. The tax regime was changed by the federal government in 2004 to enforce a minimum percentage rate, thus removing Norderfriedrichskoog's competitive advantage.

== See also ==
- Eiderstedt Peninsula
