= Am Riesenfeld =

Subdistrict in Munich, Germany

Coordinates: 48.1833°N 11.5554°E

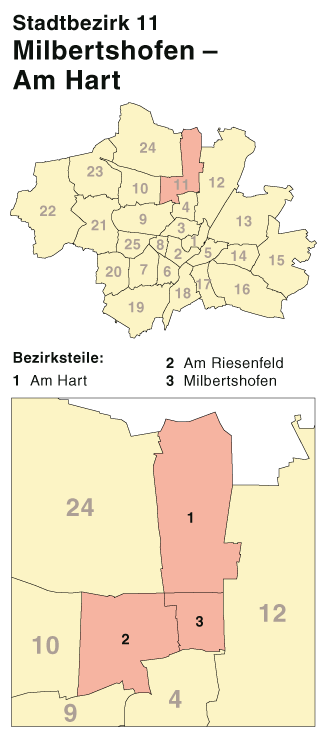
Am Riesenfeld; here number 2

Am Riesenfeld is the westernmost of the three subdistricts of the Munich city district 11 Milbertshofen-Am Hart.

== Location ==
North of the Petueltunnel route, borders the district Am Riesenfeld which is further separated by the Korbinianstraße or Schleißheimer Straße to the east, to the neighboring district Milbertshofen. In the north, it is separated from the district Lerchenau by the railway tracks or a part of the Wilhelmine-Reichard-Straße, in the west it is separated by the Landshuter Allee or the abandoned tracks of the Moosach district. In the southwest, the boundary of the district Am Riesenfeld to the district of Neuhausen-Nymphenburg runs along the Willi-Gebhardt-Ufer to the Spiridon-Luis-Ring, which forms the western boundary of the Olympia Park on the western border of the larger Olympiaberg, and then along to Ackermannstraße. In the south, the border with Schwabing-West runs along the curve of the Ackermannstraße to Winzererstraße, which together with the Lerchenauer Straße to the Petueltunnel also forms the south-east border to Schwabing-West.

== Profile ==
27,049 people live in Am Riesenfeld (2016). It has a population density of 6,255 inhabitants/km^{2} (2016). Am Riesenfeld is dominated by the Olympia Park (with the Olympiaturm, Olympiahalle, Olympiastadion, Olympia Eishalle, Sea Life Munich, Olympia Schwimmhalle, Olydorf Olympic Training Center Bavaria), BMW (with BMW Welt, BMW-Vierzylinder, BMW Museum, BMW Group Classic, BMW Plant) and the Studentenviertel Oberwiesenfeld (student residential), Am Oberwiesenfeld and Olympic Village.

The compact development in the Olympic Village provides for a quiet, child-friendly living, as the traffic within the residential area (on the Connollystraße or the Helene-Mayer-Ring) runs in the built-up basement below the pedestrian level. In Olydorf lies, with the Nadisee, Munich's smallest bathing lake. At the Helene-Mayer-Ring 23 lies the ecumenical church center. The Christl-Marie-Schultes-Weg, a pedestrian and cycle underpass under the Munich North Ring of the railway, connects the Wilhelmine Reichard Street with the street Am Oberwiesenfeld. The tunnel connects the southern Lerchenau with the subway station Oberwiesenfeld. There, is also the Adolf Kolping vocational school. The München Caribes train in the northern part of the Zentrale Hochschulsportanlage or the Sports Center of the Technical University of Munich. In 2017, the Erinnerungsort Olympia-Attentat (memorial site Olympia assassination) was opened. In the Olympic Park is Bavaria's largest beach volleyball facility. On Moosacher Straße is the company headquarters of Knorr-Bremse. In 2011, the city of Munich has acquired a 6.7-acre site around the railway station Munich Olympic Stadium from the Deutsche Bahn. This is to improve the network of cycle paths in Munich and create a High line-like park trail towards Dreiseenplatte. At Willi-Daume-Platz is the Munich Olympic Walk of Stars. The entire area is connected via the Olympiazentrum Underground Station and the Oberwiesenfeld Underground Station to the U3 line.

== Events ==
Larger concerts and sports events take place in the Olympiahall and in the Olympic Stadium. At the intervening Coubertinplatz, the annually Impark Summer Festival, Theatron-Festival, Munich Mash, the SattelFest, the Munich Midsummer Night's Dream and other concerts take place. In addition, the Coubertinplatz is regularly the starting point of numerous running events such as the Munich Marathon, the Wings for Life World Run Munich, the Spartan Race Munich, the Red Bull Crashed Ice, the Munich company run or the B2RUN German company run championship. See also: Events in the Olympic Park

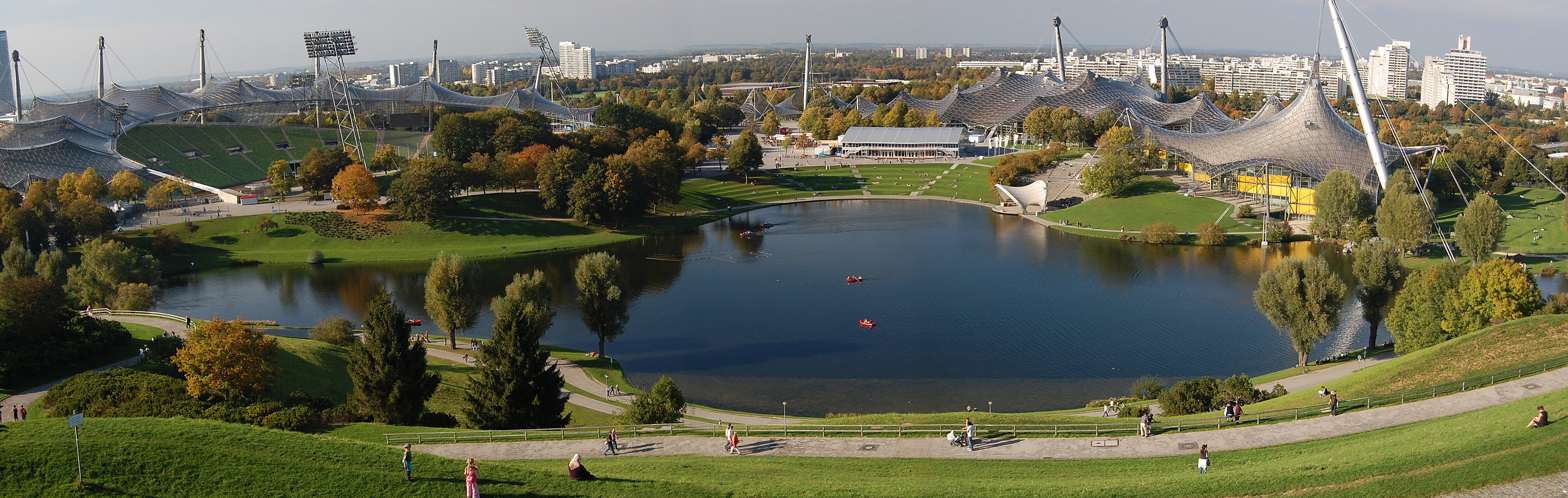
Olympiapark

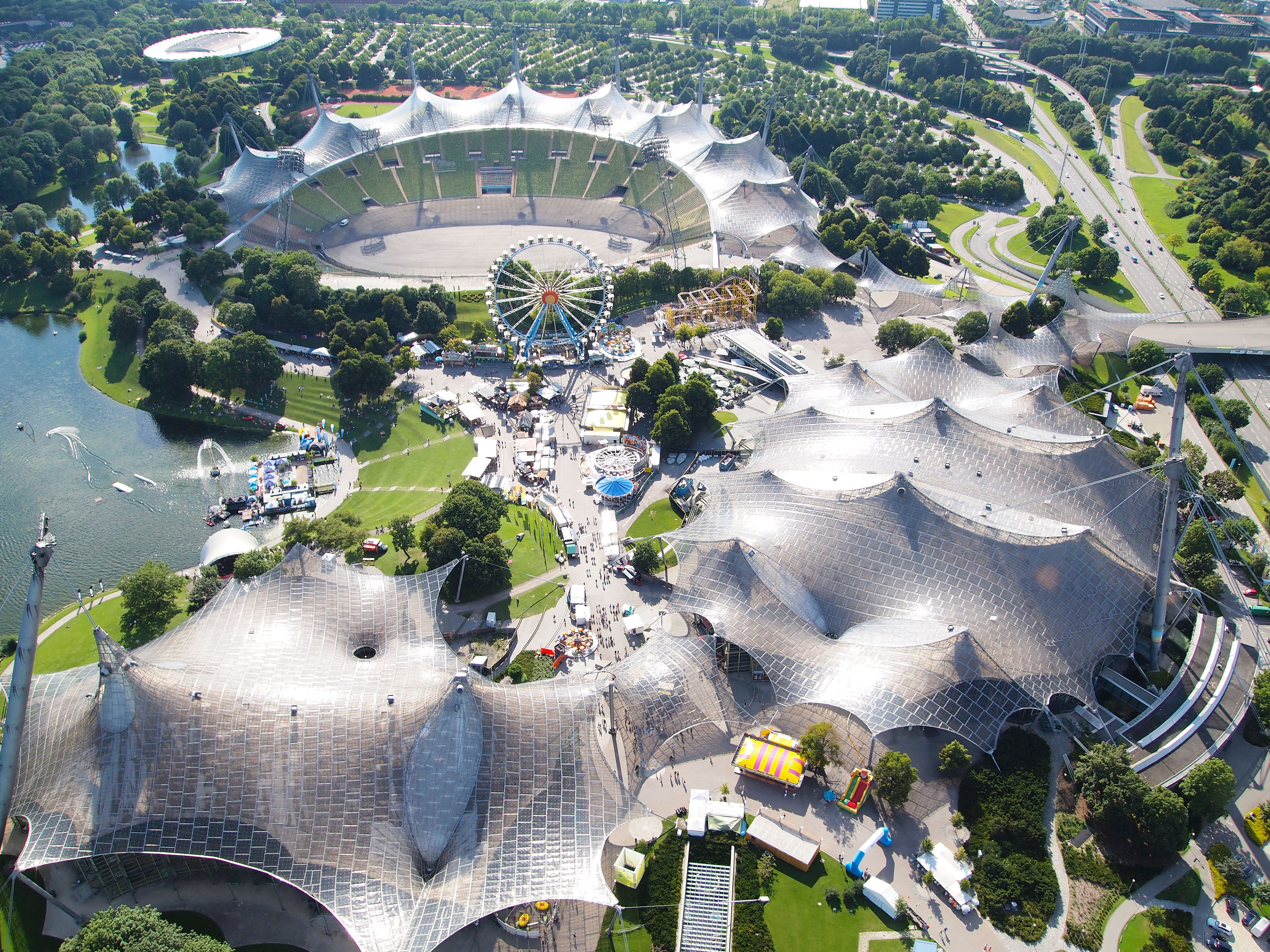
Olympiahalle, Olympiastadion und Olympia Schwimmhalle

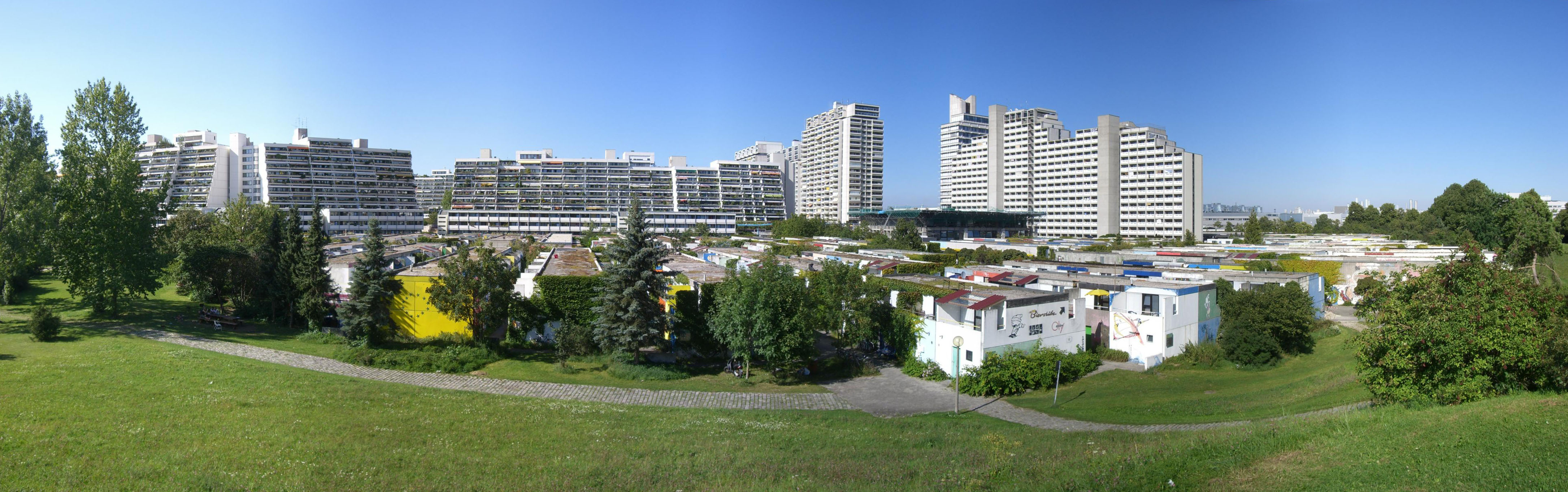
Olympic Village with student district

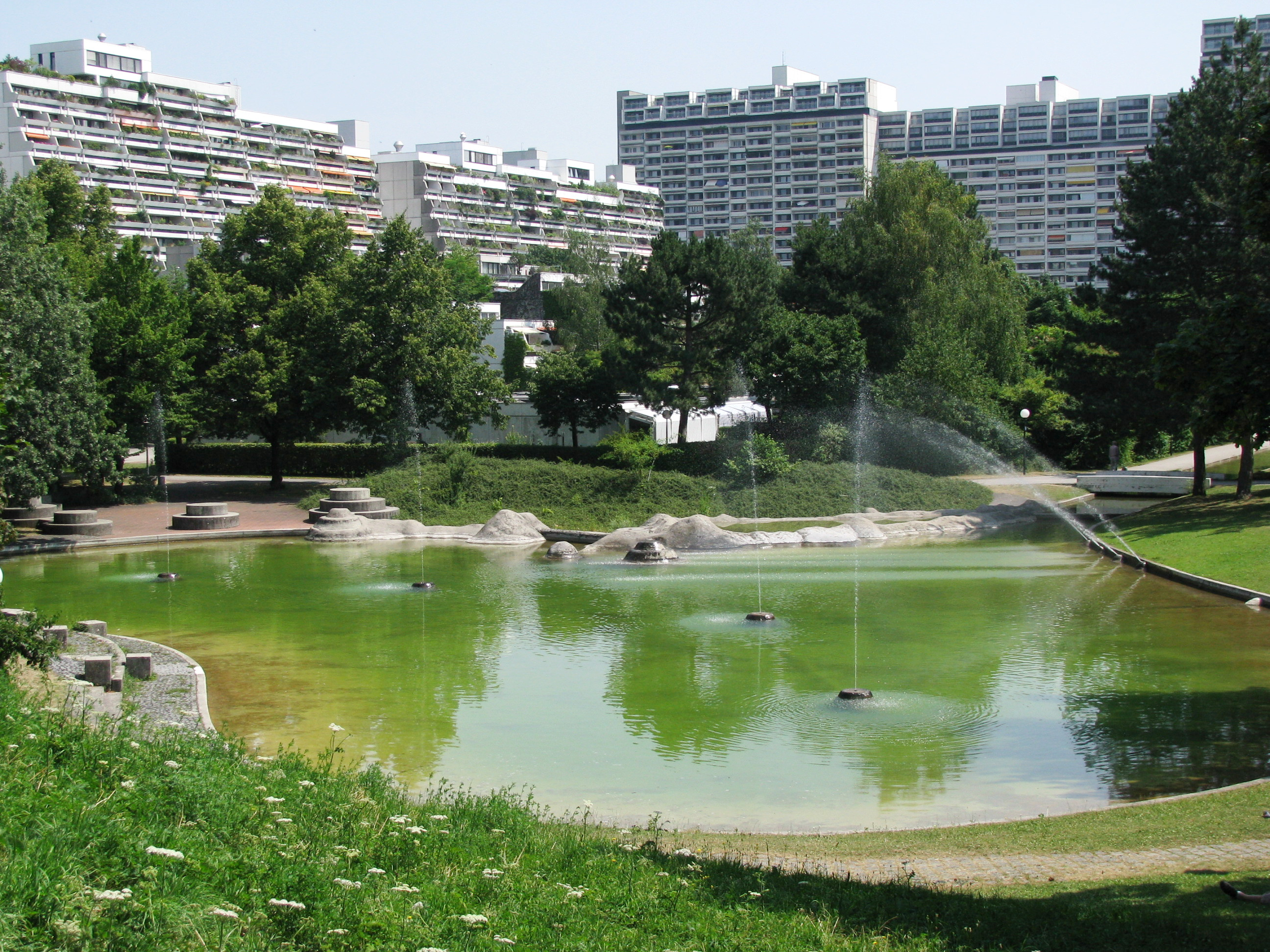
Nadisee

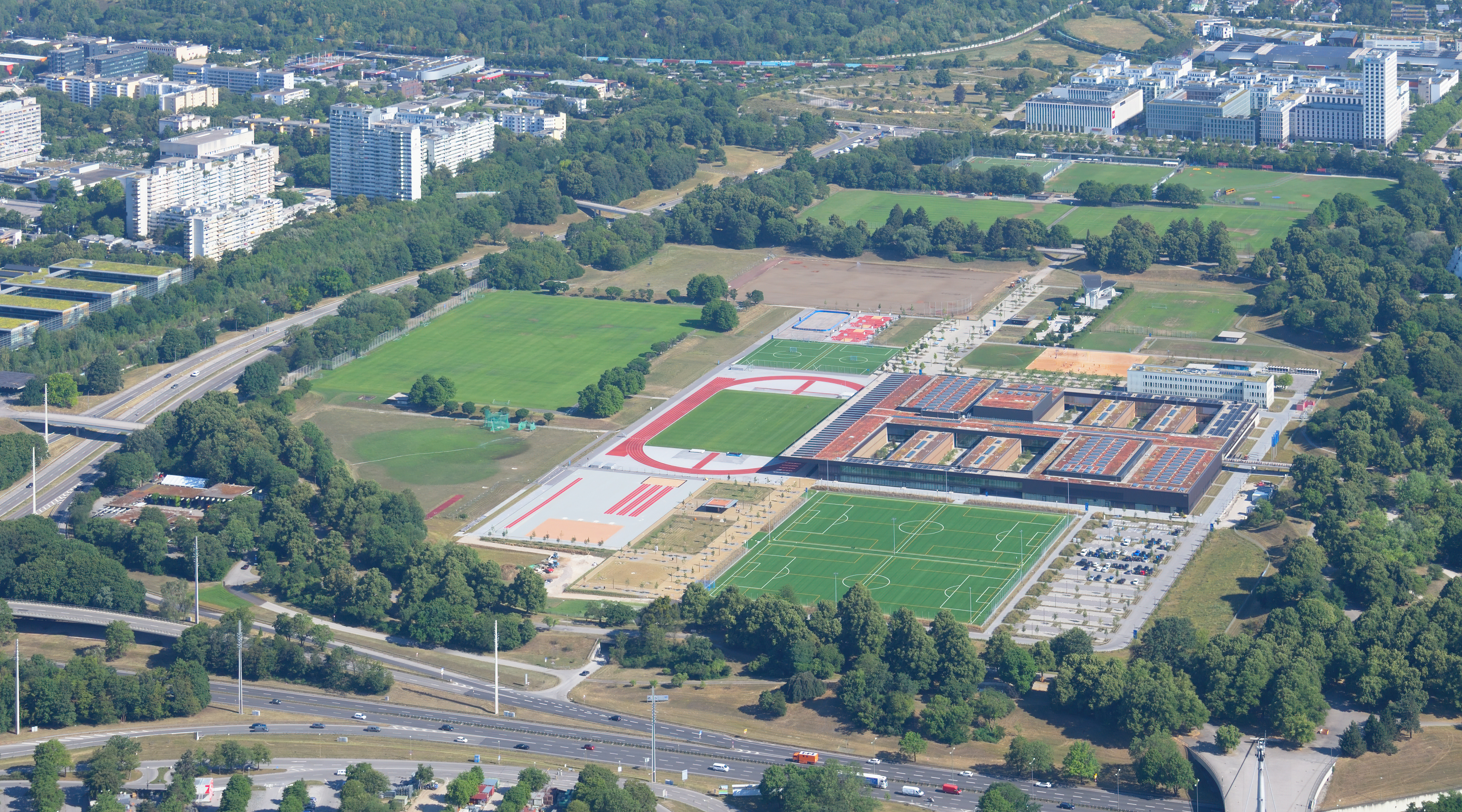
Zentrale Hochschulsportanlage

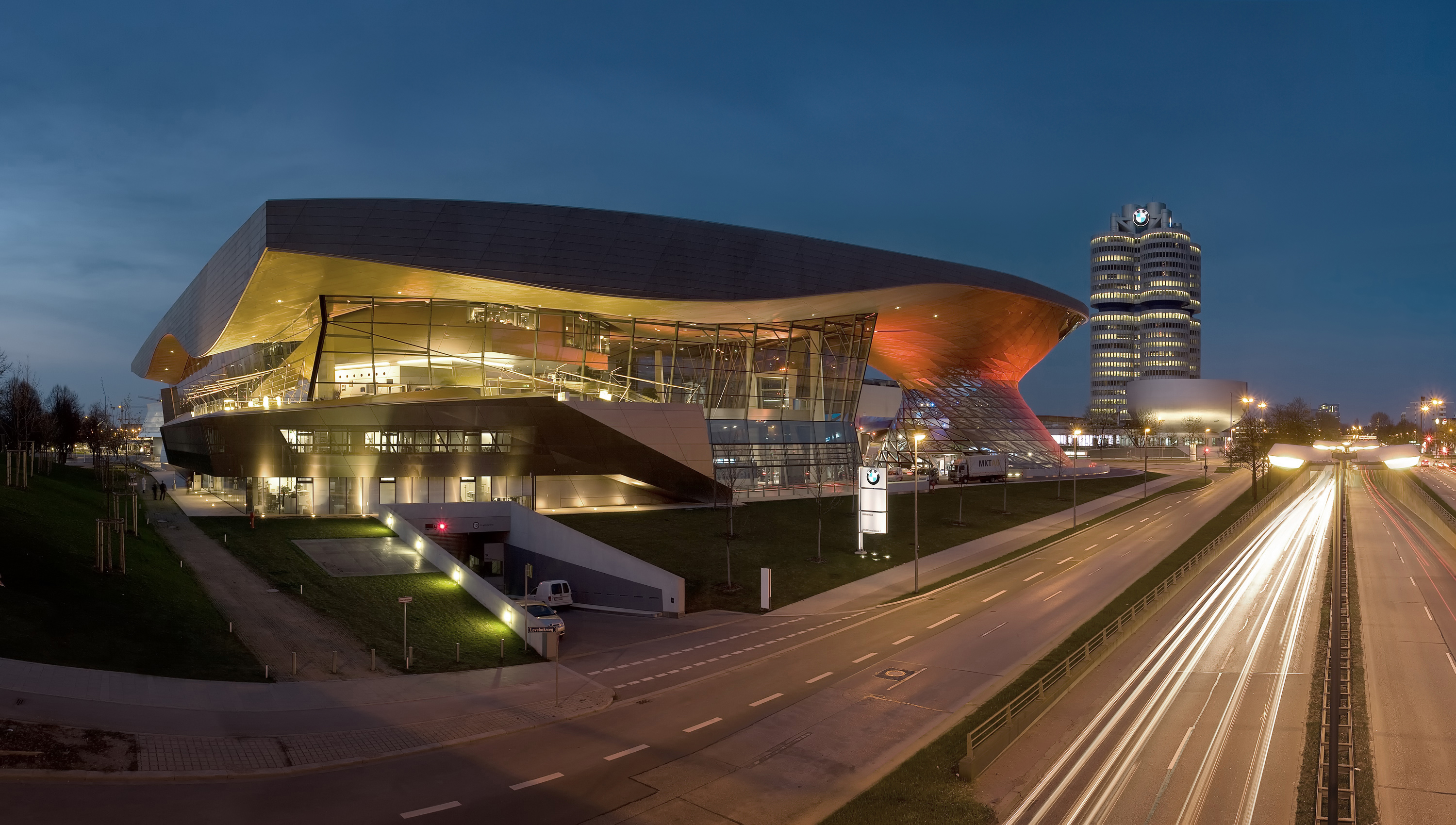
BMW Welt, BMW-Vierzylinder und BMW Museum

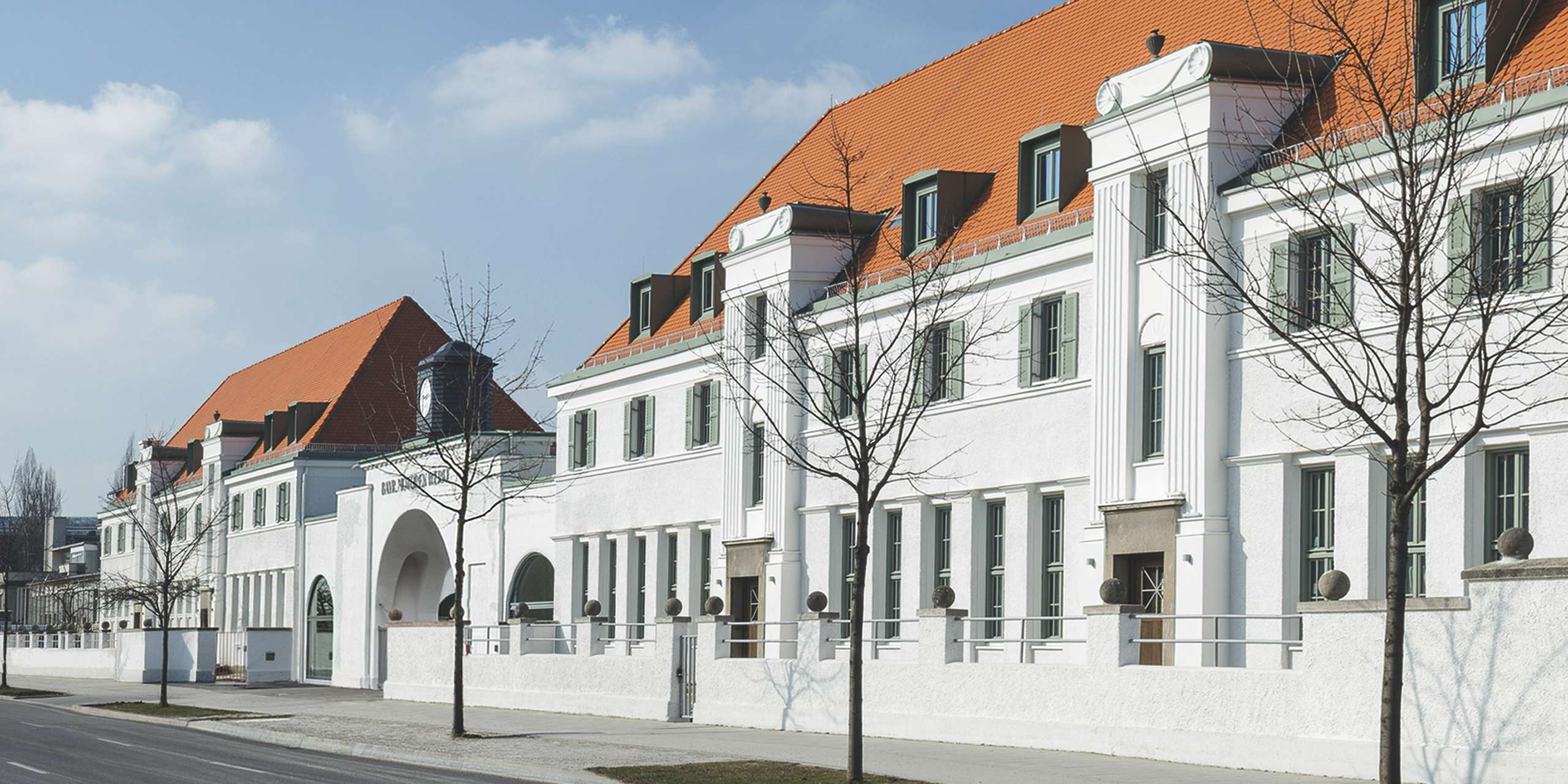
BMW Group Classic

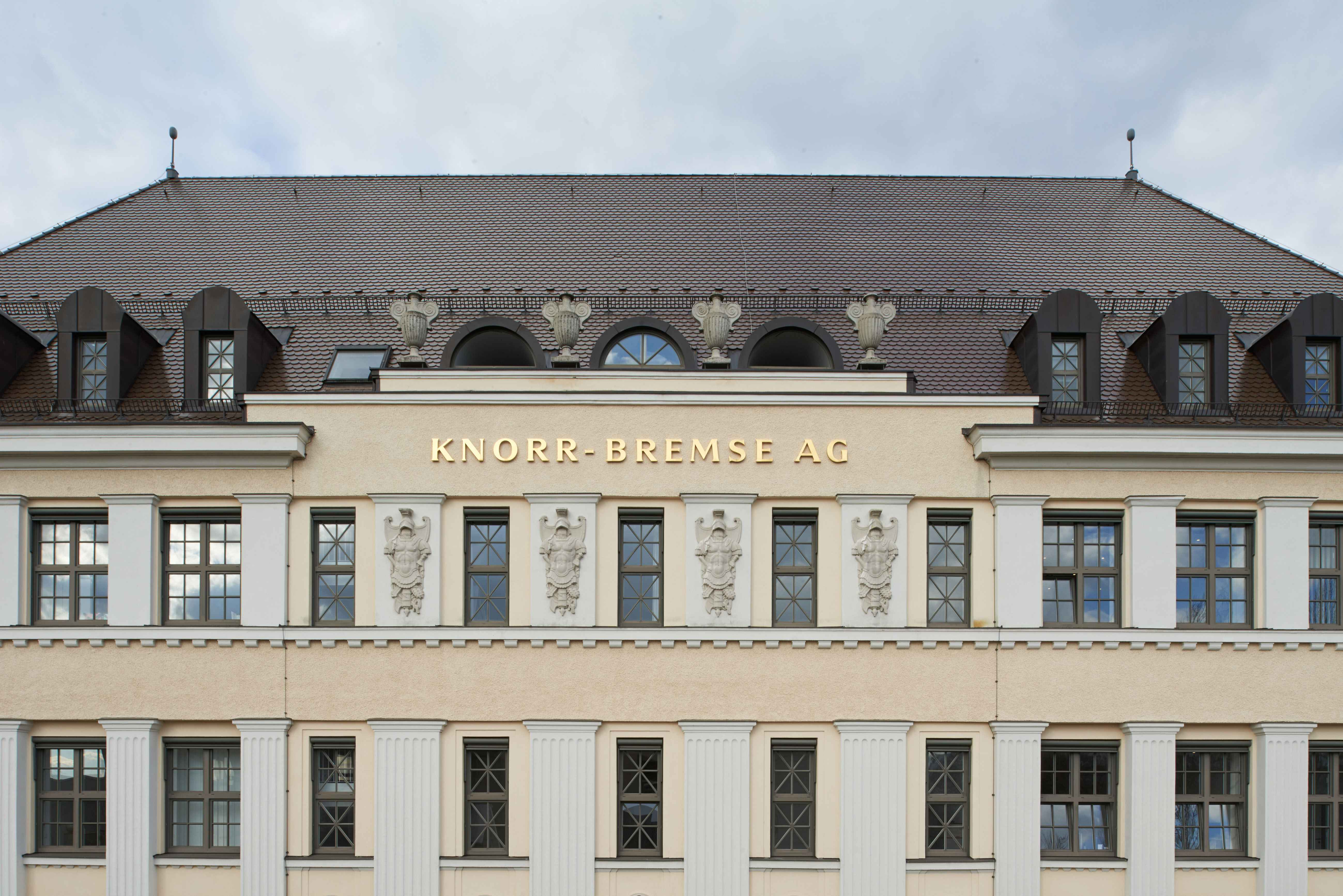
Headquarters of the Knorr-Bremse Group

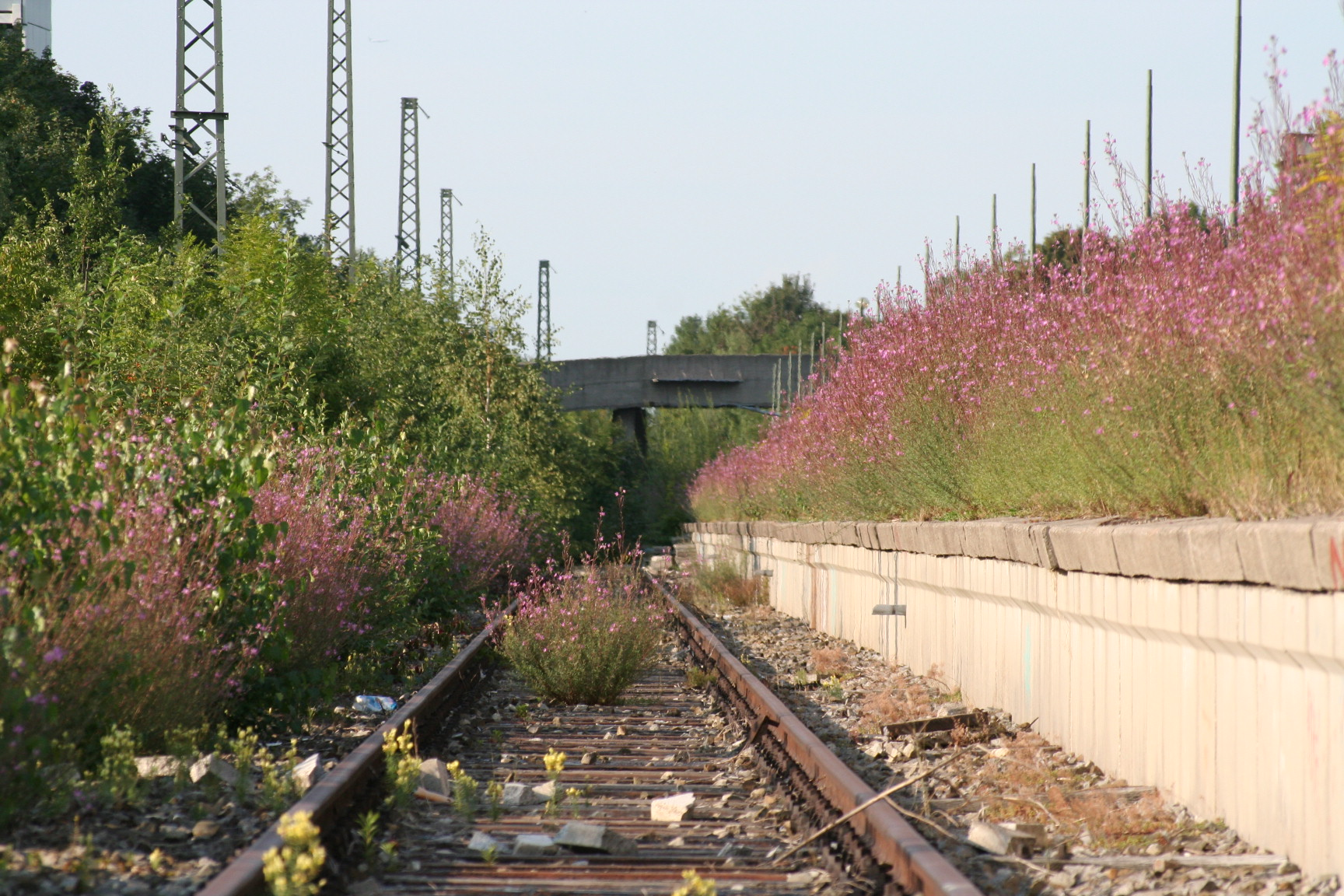
Greenroute at the abandoned station Munich Olympic Stadium

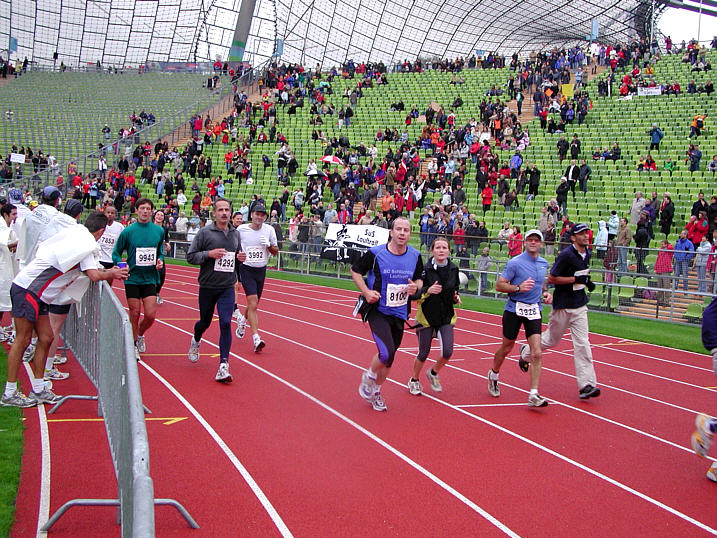
Munich Marathon

== History ==
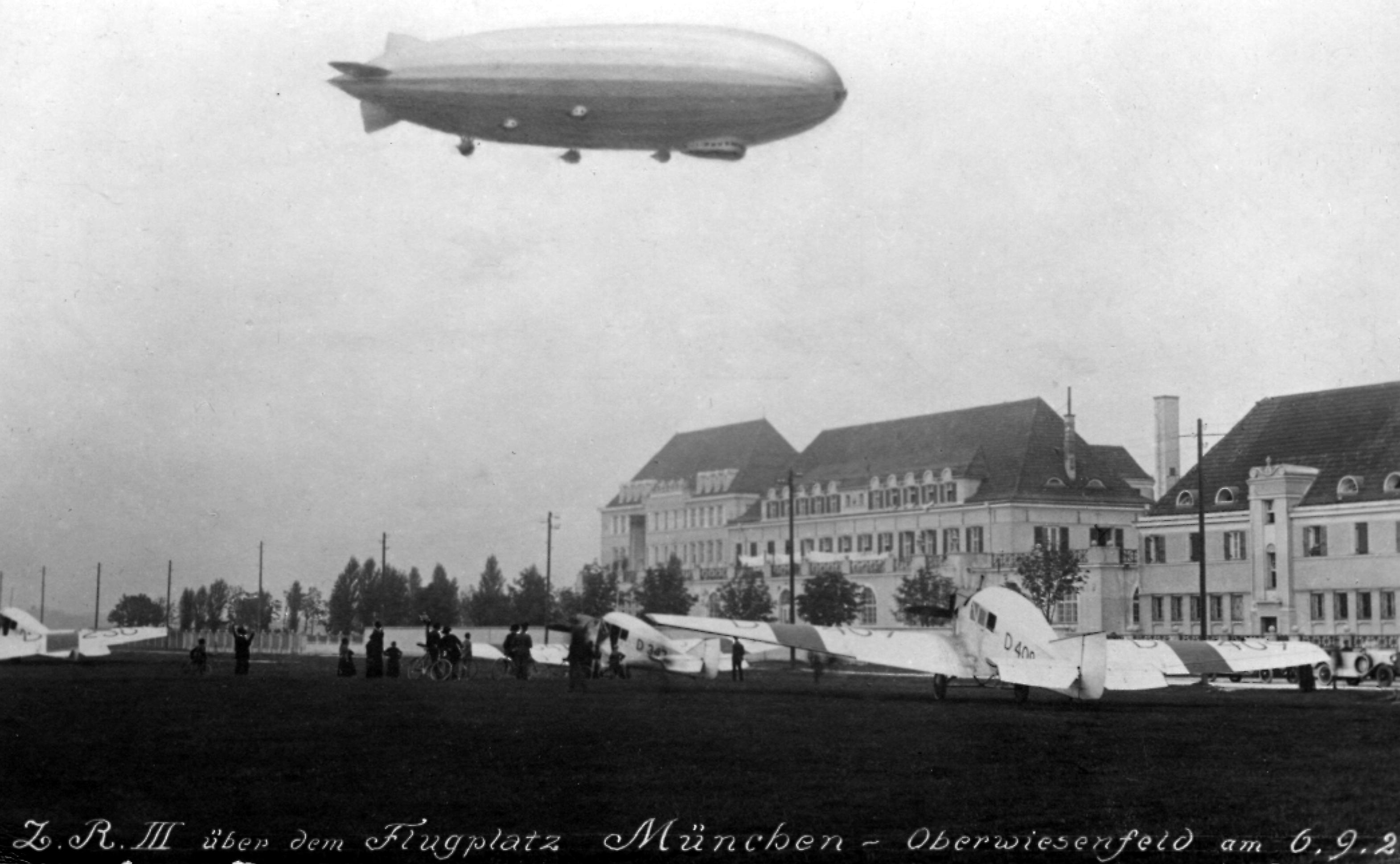
Zeppelin LZ 126 above the Oberwiesenfeld in front of the Knorr-Bremse building, 1924

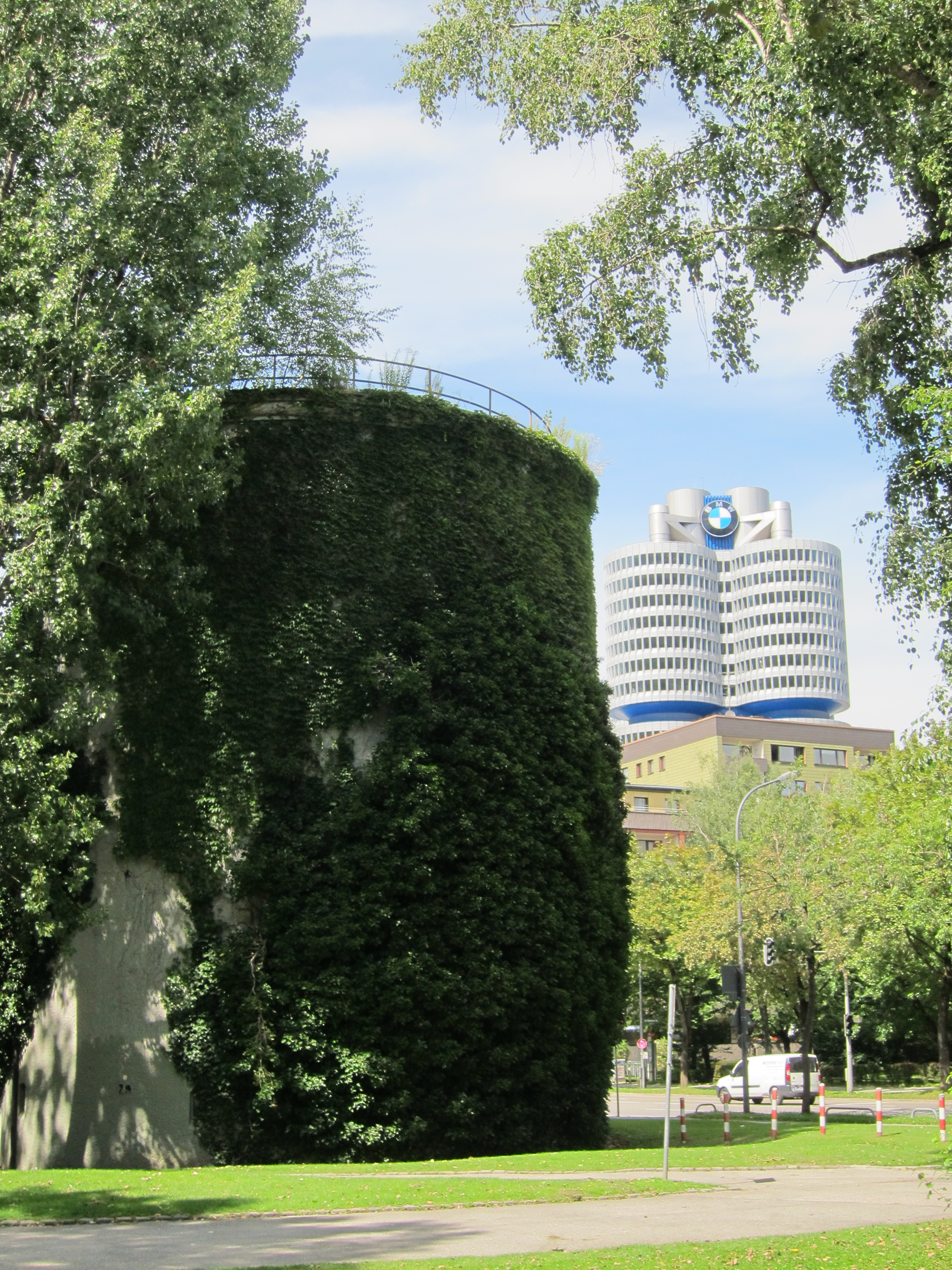
Above ground bunker Lerchenauer Straße in the background the BMW-Vierzylinder

1800 was the 1764 first Schwaige named St. Georgenschwaige (1568 St. Georgen, 1620 at St. Georgen) sold to four Upper Palatinate settlers. On the property which was uncovered after the destruction, the settlement with the name Riesenfeld, which today is known as altes Riesenfeld (old giant field), was built at the curve of the Nymphenburg-Biedersteiner Kanal at the today's corner Petuelring / Belgradstraße. This area was in 1818, part of the then community Schwabing and was together incorporated into Munich in November 1890.

The today's area Am Riesenfeld was named Risenfeld for the first time on 8 January 1800. It goes back to the couple Andrä von Riß, Hofkammerrat (Council of the Court Chamber) in Freising and Theresia, which on 12 June 1796 bought the bleacher based on a Dutch (English) system, operated since 1790 at the canal curve, from the brothers Franz Xaver and Joseph Lunglmayr. Andrä von Riß died already in 1798. His widow and the children then again sold the possession called izt Risenfeld, on 8 January 1800. The Restoration Bad Georgenschwaige was later set up in the former bleach house.

North of the channel was later a new settlement Riesenfeld, but which was on Milbertshofener area and was incorporated with Milbertshofen in 1913. In 1941, the above ground bunkers Lerchenauer Straße and Anhalter Platz were built. Before the site in the period from 1966 to 1972 was completely redesigned due to the games of XX. Olympia 1972, it was called Oberwiesenfeld and housed only a large airfield in addition to its use as a military site, on which the first commercial airport of Munich was located from 1929 to 1939 and the aircraft engines manufactured in the neighboring factory of BMW were tested until 1945 and from 1957 to 1968 the general aviation harbored. The area south of today's Georg-Brauchle-Ring, which is characterized by the sports venues, the Olympia-Parkharfe and the large Olympiaberg, belonged to the district Neuhausen-Oberwiesenfeld until 1992 and came part of the district Am Riesenfeld during the redivision of the districts in 1996.

== Others ==
The Munich Riesenfeldstraße is named after the district Am Riesenfeld.
