= Studentenviertel Oberwiesenfeld =

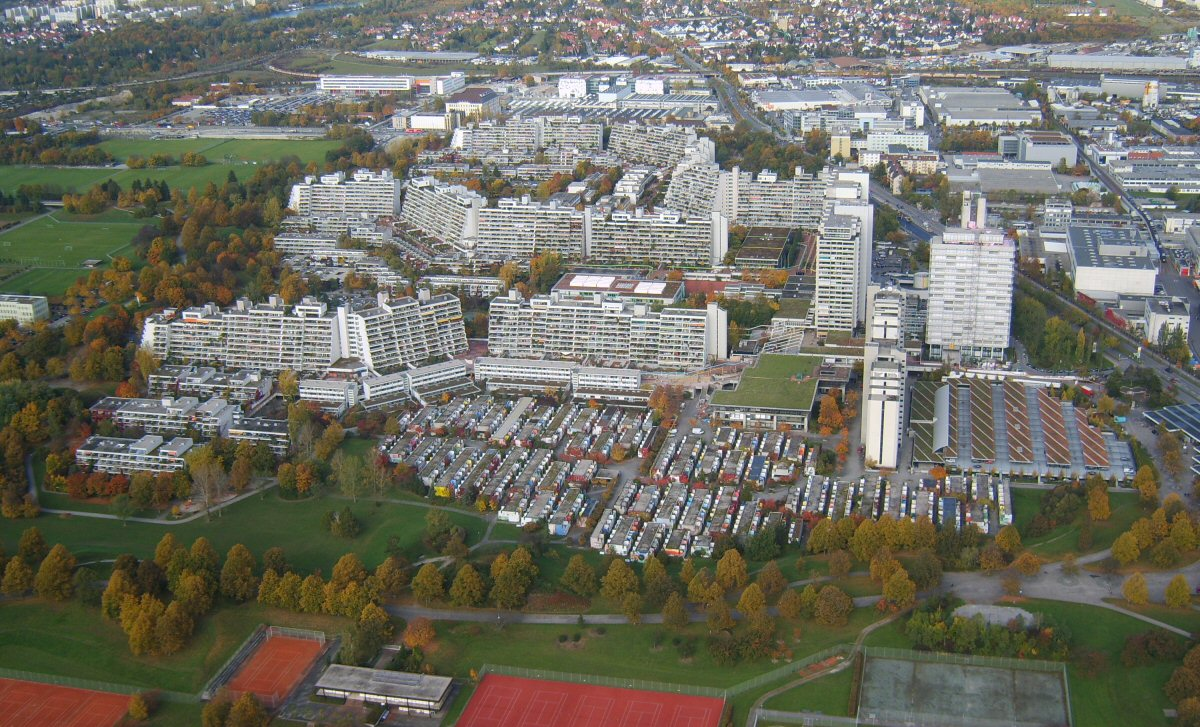
The Olympic Village seen from the Olympic Tower, in the foreground the bungalows, family apartments and skyscrapers (right) of the student district

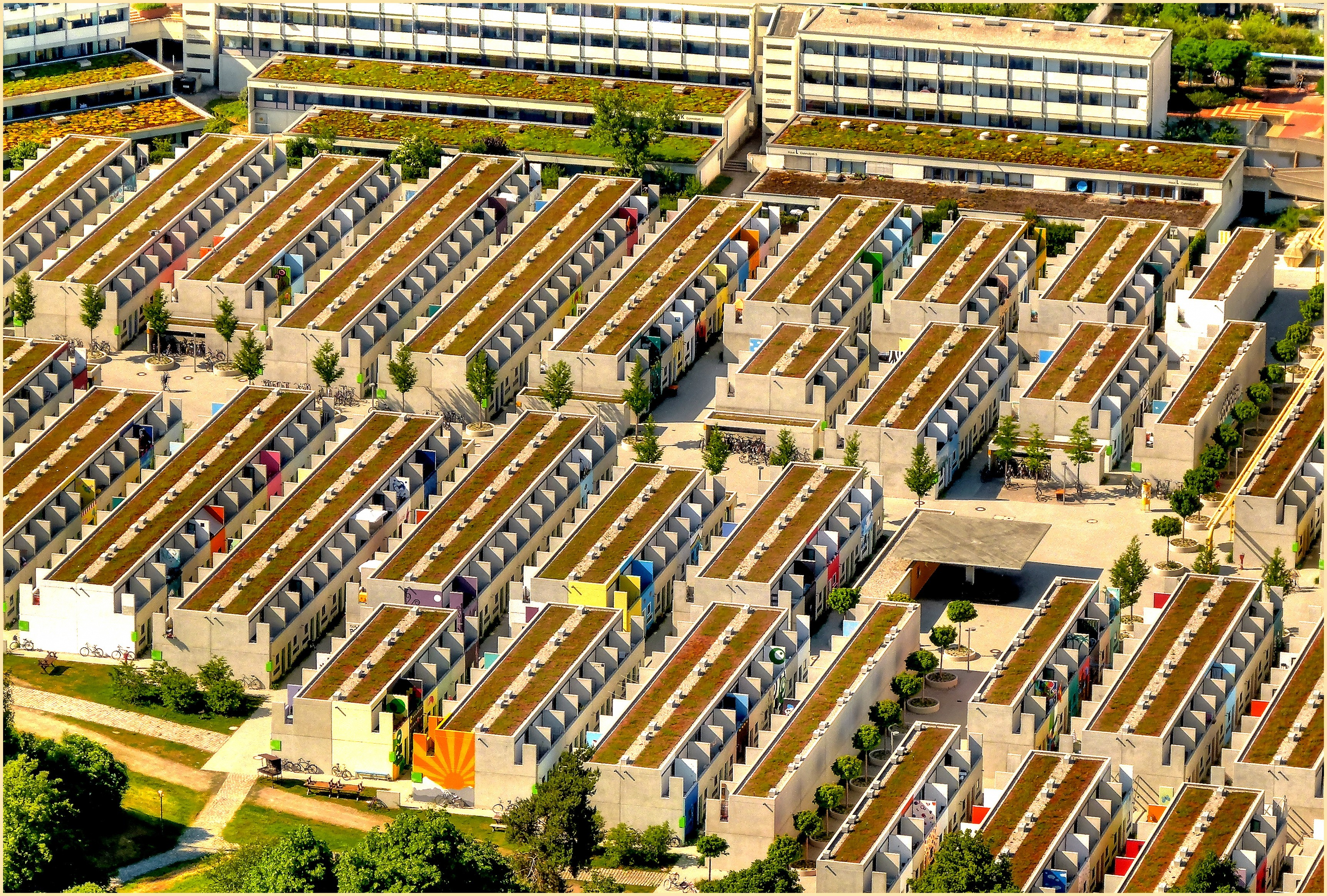
Student residences

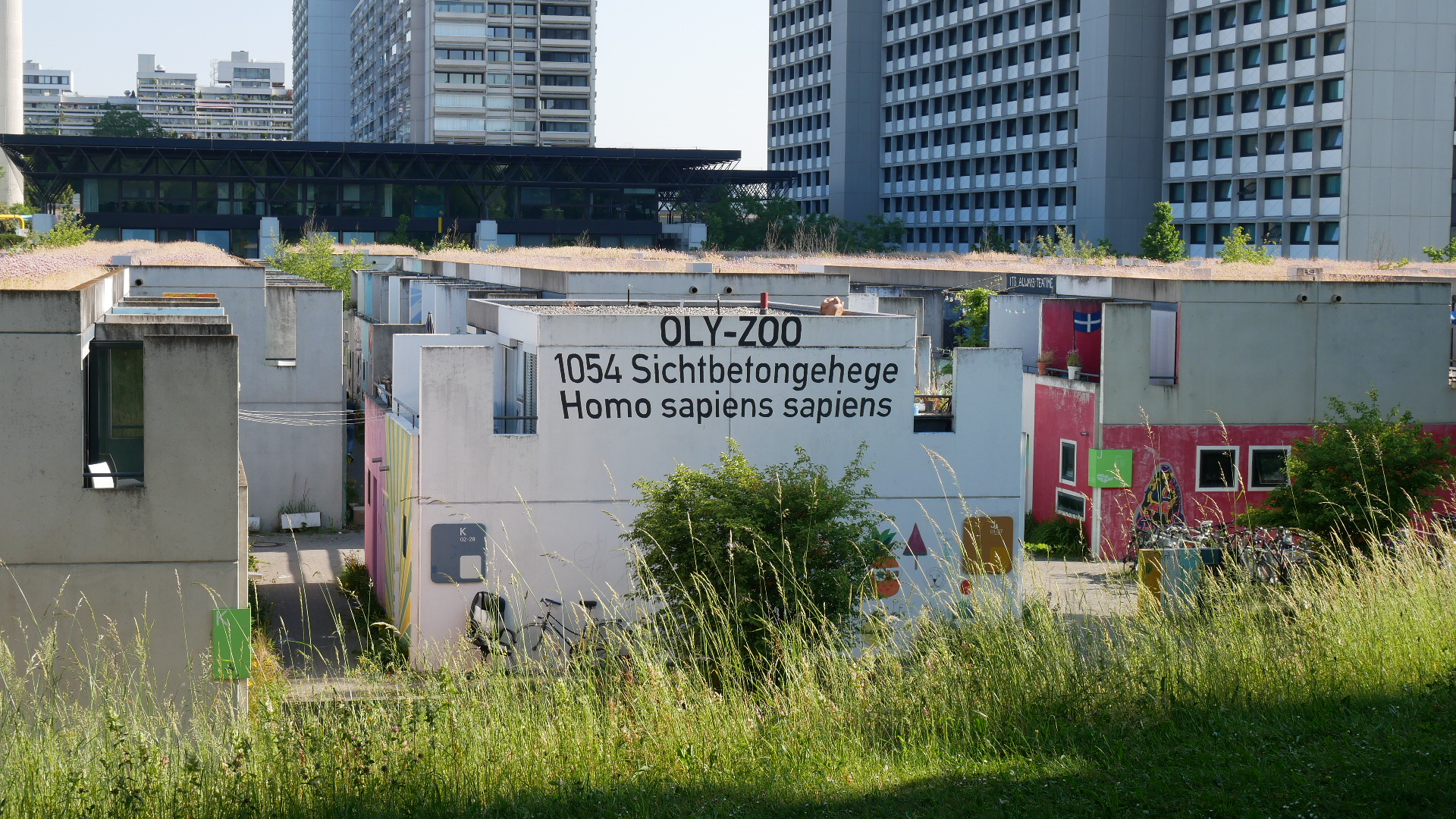
Artwork on a building in Olydorf. In German, it says, "OLY-ZOO, Exposed concrete enclosure: Homo Sapiens."

The Studentenviertel Oberwiesenfeld, also known as a student village or because of its location in the Olympic Park, sometimes called Olydorf, is a student residency in Munich. It is located on the former site of the Olympic Village of the 1972 Summer Olympics in Munich. After the student city Freimann, it is, with currently about 1953 residents, the second largest housing estate of the Studentenwerk München (Munich Student Union).

== Location ==
The student district Oberwiesenfeld is part of the former Olympic Village, which is located in the north of Munich in district 11 Milbertshofen-Am Hart between the middle ring (Georg-Brauchle-Ring or Landshuter Allee), Moosacher Straße and Lerchenauer Straße. The residential complex is embedded in the Olympic Park and borders the Central University Sports Center (ZHS) and the Sports Center of the Technical University of Munich. In the immediate vicinity is the BMW headquarters with the associated BMW Museum and the BMW Welt.

The streets of the Olympic Village were named after pioneers of Olympic sports. The Helene-Mayer-Ring and Connollystraße lead through the student district.

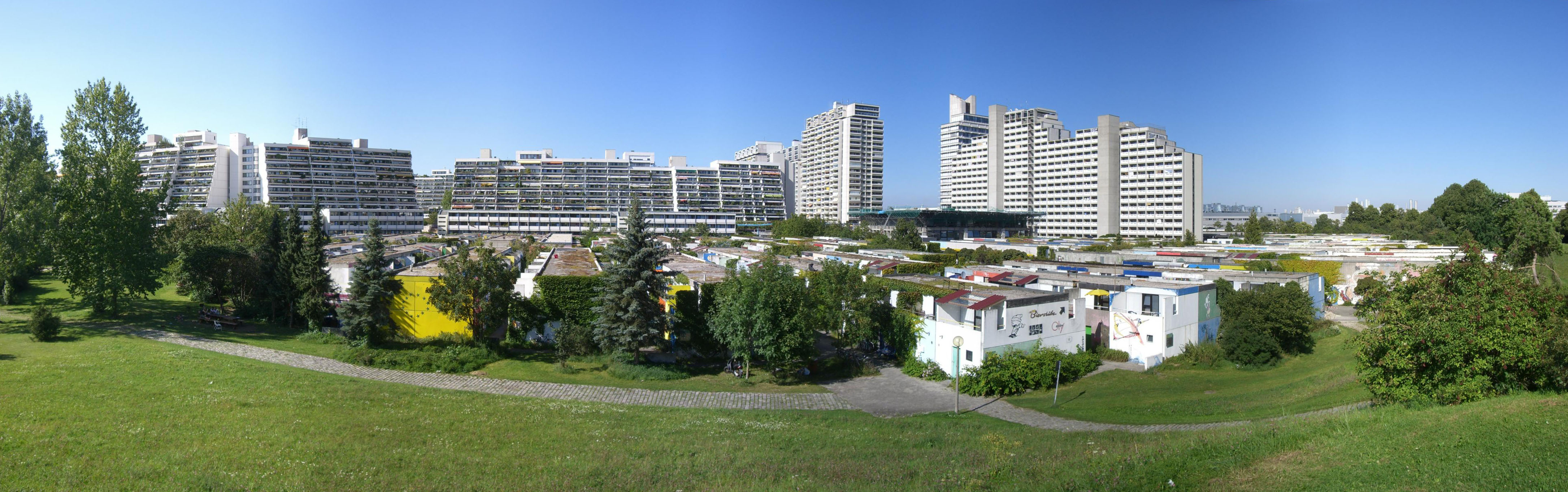
Olympic village with student district

== History ==
The Olympic village was built in the context of 1972 Summer XX. Olympics in Munich. To build the Men's Olympic Village, five building companies were commissioned. The Studentenwerk München commissioned the Munich architects Günther Eckert and Werner Wirsing with the construction of a student residency that was used as an Olympic village for women during the Olympic Games. The bungalows in the south are still used today as a dormitory and to be held apart from the student city Freimann, were referred to as a student district or student village. A skyscraper and some of the terrace buildings are also used as a dormitory. From spring 2007, the bungalows were partially demolished over a period of three years and rebuilt monument-appropriate, since renovating the existing buildings would not have been cheaper. Of the old bungalows, 12 were original preserved and renovated. The re-opening of the bungalows took place in 2009/2010. By reducing the width of the building, the number of bungalows increased from 800 to 1,052. The total number of residential units in the student district therefore increased to 1953. The name goes back to the fact that the area is located on the Oberwiesenfeld.

== Living ==
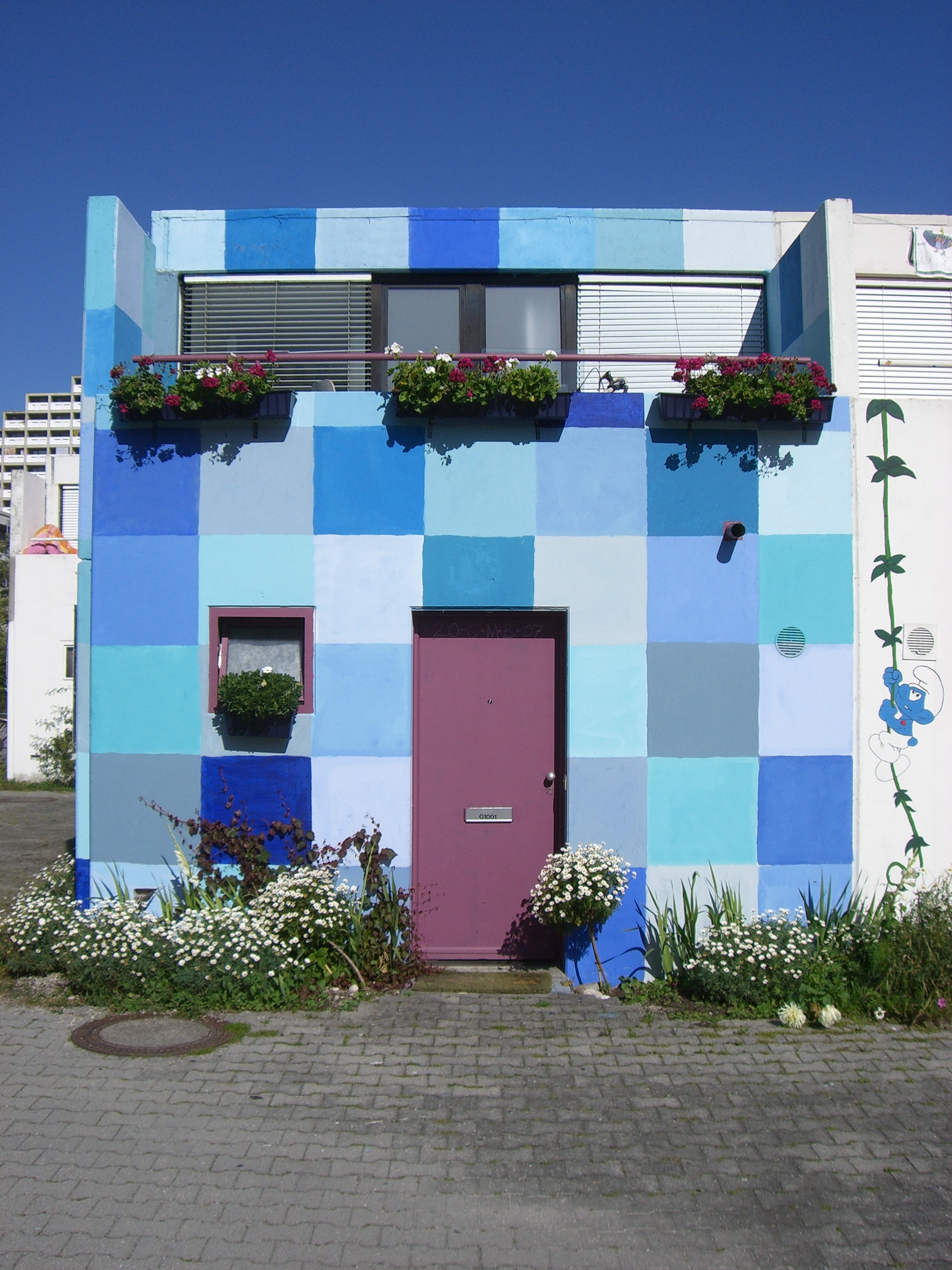
Bungalow with painting

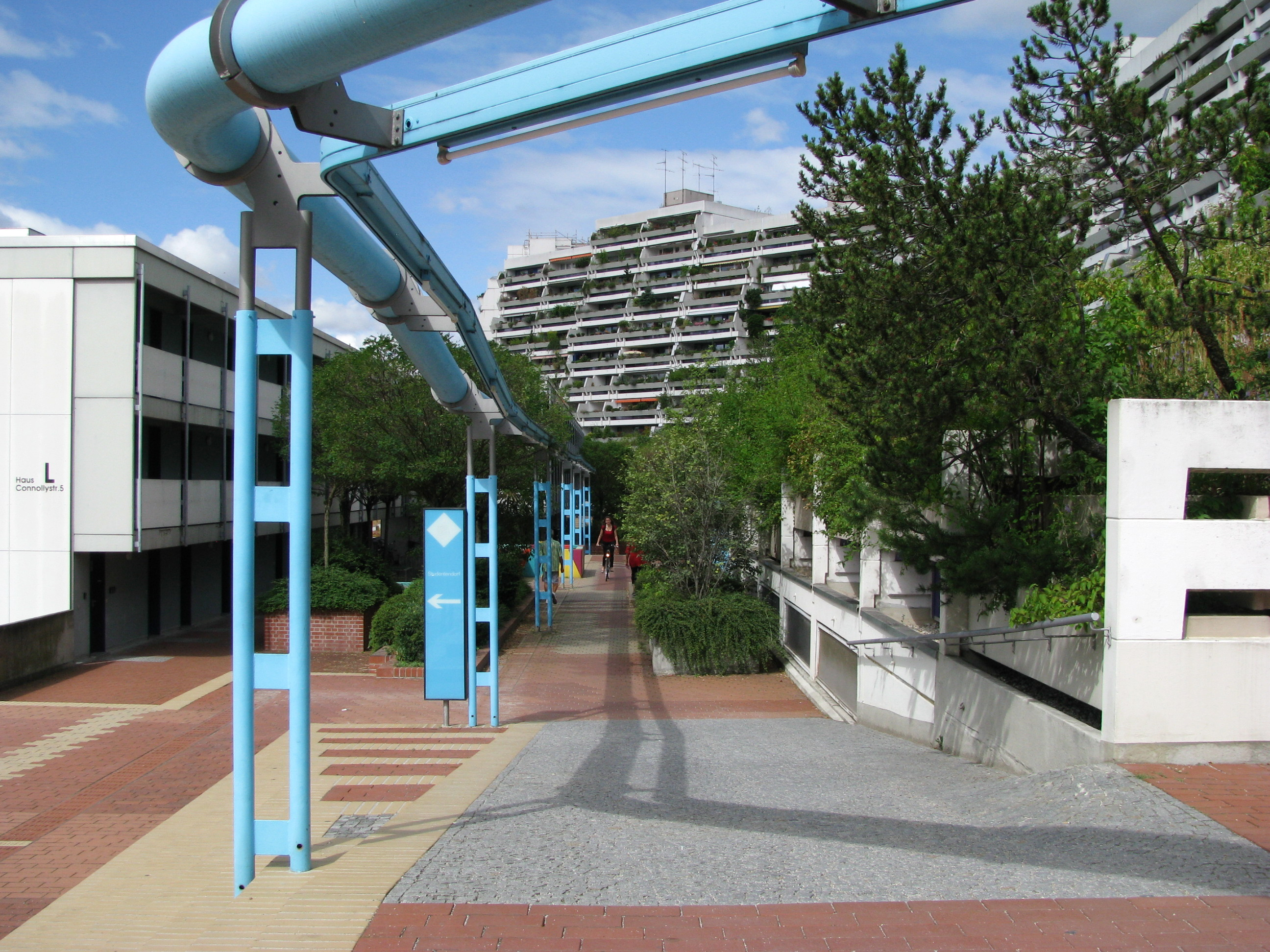
Connollystraße

The Olydorf used by students consists of three living areas.

First, there are the 1052 (formerly 800) single bungalows. Characteristic was the painting of the bungalow doors and facades, which was an expression of European youth culture. During the renovation of the bungalows for the 2002 European Athletics Championships, the doors were exchanged among other things and the paintings were therefore partially lost. The bungalows were an extremely popular form of housing among students before the renovation work started. The reinforced concrete precast newly built mini houses are oriented substantially to the original bungalows of 1972. In the planning for the new construction of the bungalows, Werner Wirsing one of the old architects, was involved. The residents have a two-storey maisonette apartment, which has a kitchenette, bathroom and terrace. In addition, every new resident has the right to design the façade of his bungalow himself.

In the skyscraper (houses A and B) at Helene-Mayer-Ring 7, 801 students live in single apartments, each with its own kitchenette, bathroom and after the renovations, without a balcony. After the re-opening of the bungalows, the skyscraper was renovated from 2010 to 2012.

There are also around 100 residential units in family apartments in Connollystraße 7 to 11, which are inhabited by young families with or without children.

== Student self-government ==
The residential complex "Olydorf" is managed by students in cooperation with the Studentenwerk München. Because of this, house speakers are elected by the residents each semester. In order to make the community life more attractive, the Association of students in the Olympic center e.V. was founded in 1974.

== Community center ==
The Old Mensa of the Olympians serves today primarily as a community center for students. There are several student operated facilities in the building. These include, in particular, the "OlyDisco", the pub "Die Bierstube", the student cinema "Olywood" and various workshops. In addition, the entire community center is used annually for the student carnival Olympialust. After the end of carnival in 2010, a general renovation of the community center was planned.

== Transportation connections ==
The Olydorf is connected by a subway line and three bus lines. The Munich underground line 3 has the stops Olympiazentrum in the east and Oberwiesenfeld in the north of the residential area. In the east-west direction is the city bus line 50 from the northern end of the student district, in the north-south direction is the city bus line 173 and the city bus line 180 running on the eastern side of the student district and on weekends the night line N46.
