= Oberwiesenfeld station =

Station of the Munich U-Bahn

Oberwiesenfeld

General information
- Location: Milbertshofen; Munich, Germany
- Coordinates: 48°11′10″N 11°32′52″E
- Platforms: Island platform
- Tracks: 2

Construction
- Structure type: Underground
- Accessible: Yes

Other information
- Fare zone: : M

History
- Opened: 28 October 2007; 18 years ago

Services
Preceding station	Munich U-Bahn	Following station
Olympia-Einkaufszentrum towards Munich-Moosach	U3	Olympiazentrum towards Fürstenried West
Location

Oberwiesenfeld is a station on the Munich U-Bahn which opened on October 28, 2007. It is located at the Moosacher Straße at the northern end of the Olympiapark, near the Olympic Village in Am Riesenfeld.
