= Lerchenauer Straße =

Arterial road in Munich, Germany

The Lerchenauer Straße is a 5.5 km long arterial road in Munich.

== Description ==
Lerchenauer Straße runs from Schleissheimer Straße east of the Olympiapark (with access to the Central Hochschule Sports Complex, a bunker, the Olympic Village and the Studenten quarters via the Helene-Mayer-Ring and Connollystrasse) at the BMW Welt, the BMW Museum and passed the U-Bahn -Bahnhof Olympiazentrum in north-north-west direction near the Dreiseenplatte up to the Plaumstraße in Feldmoching. It crosses the Moosacher Straße and the Georg-Brauchle-Ring / Petuelring. The Lerchenauer Straße therefore crosses the districts of Schwabing, Am Riesenfeld and Feldmoching. North of Moosacher Straße, it crosses the Munich North Ring through an underpass at the Milbertshofen station. South of the Feldmoching railway station, the Lerchenauer Straße crosses the connecting route of Feldmoching to the North Ring and the Munich–Regensburg railway on two over passes.

The Lerchenauer Straße was named after the colony of Lerchenau, which has been part of Feldmoching since 1901 on the outskirts of Munich and was incorporated into Munich in 1938. Until 1946 the Lerchenauer Straße was called Münchner Straße.

== Images ==
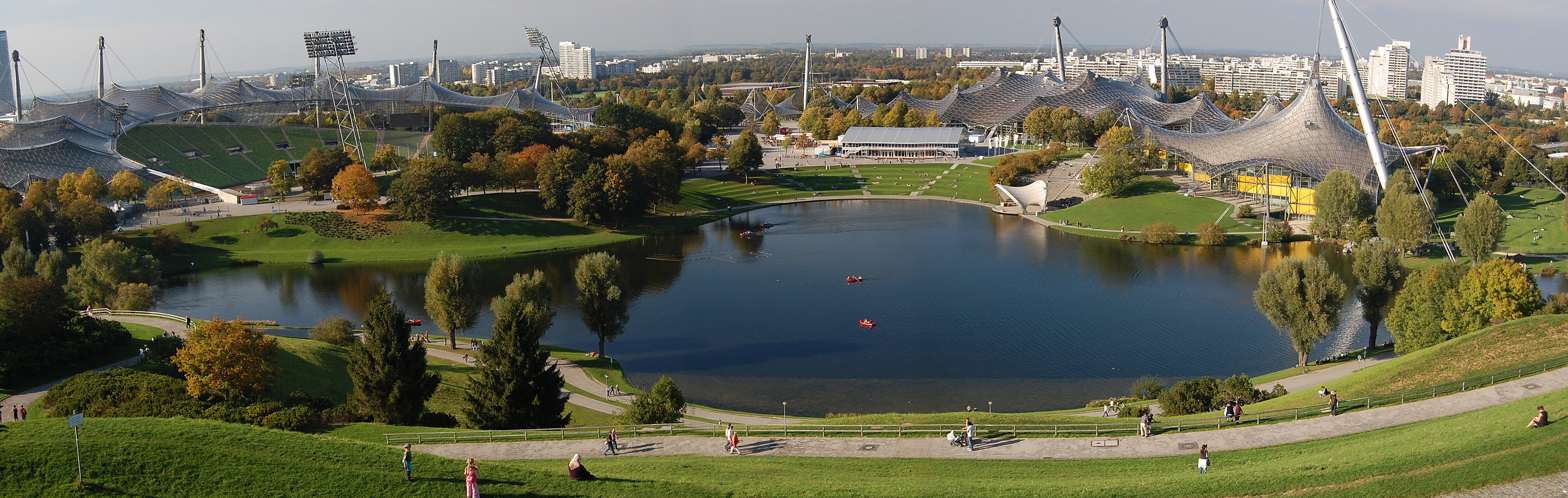
Olympiapark

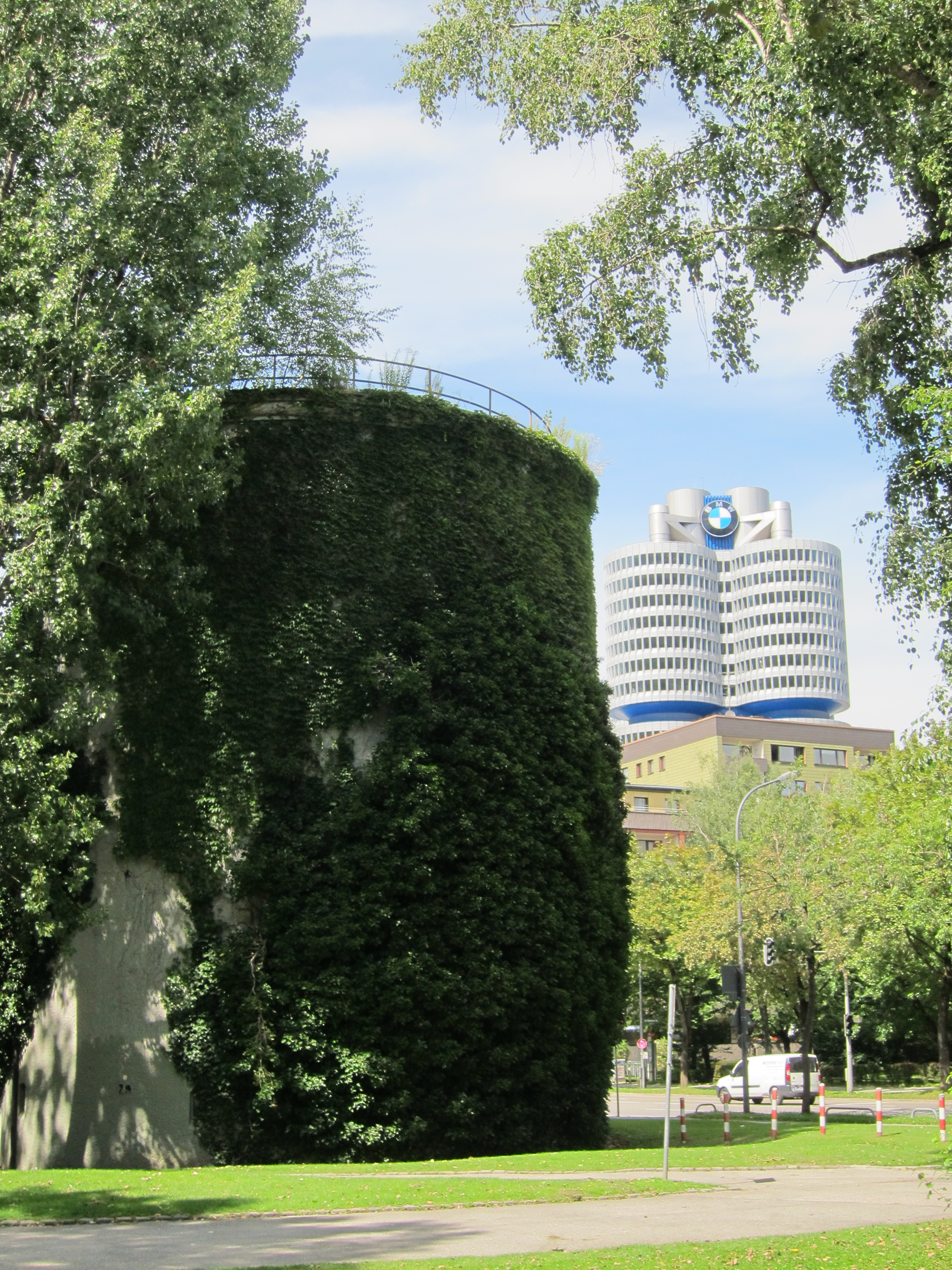
Hochbunker

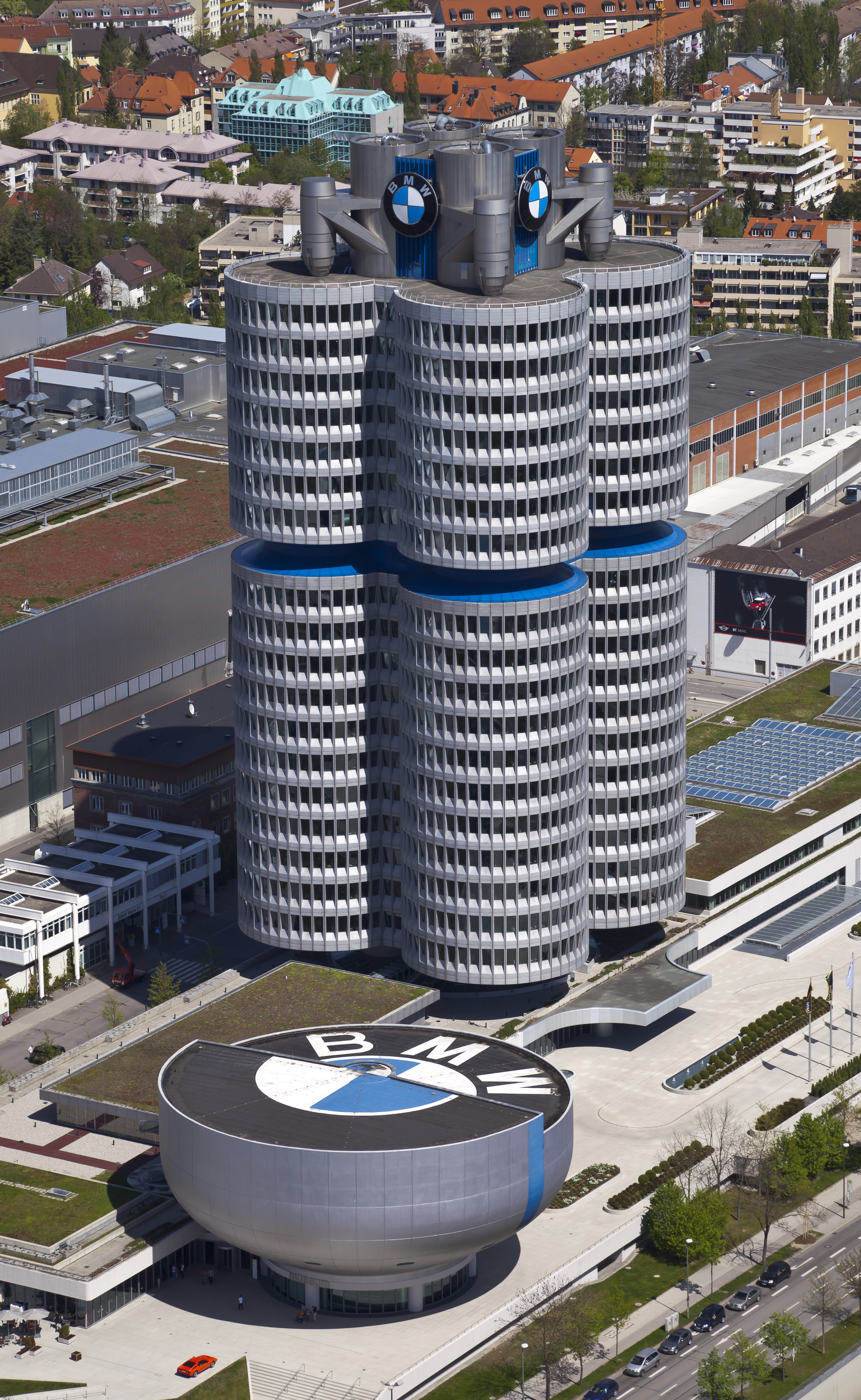
BMW-Museum

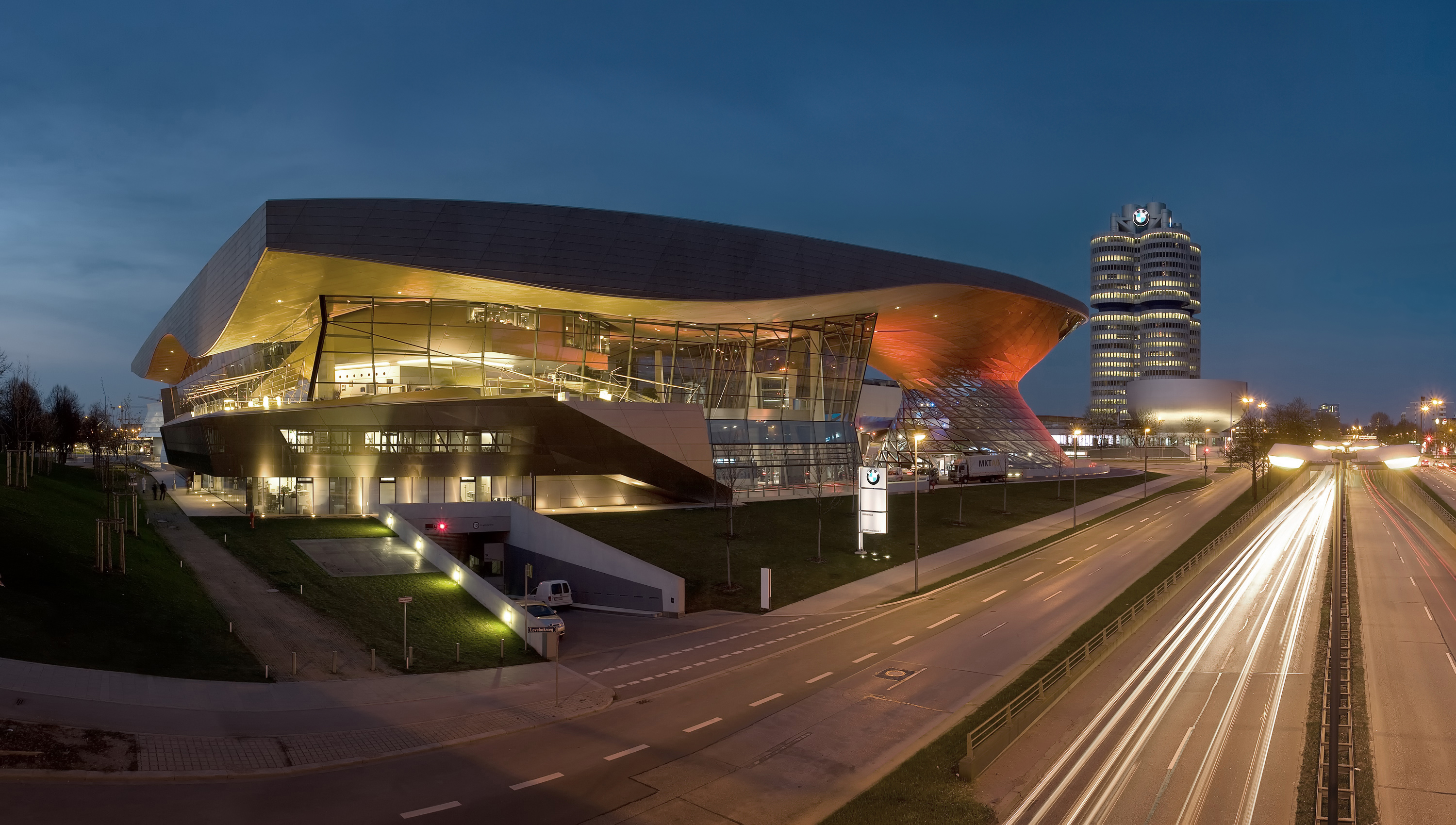
BMW-Welt

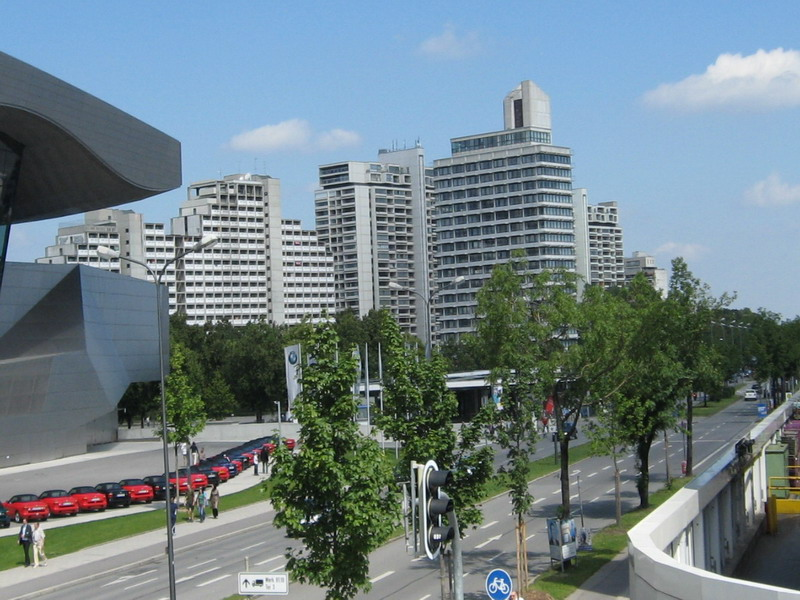
Olympia-Tower

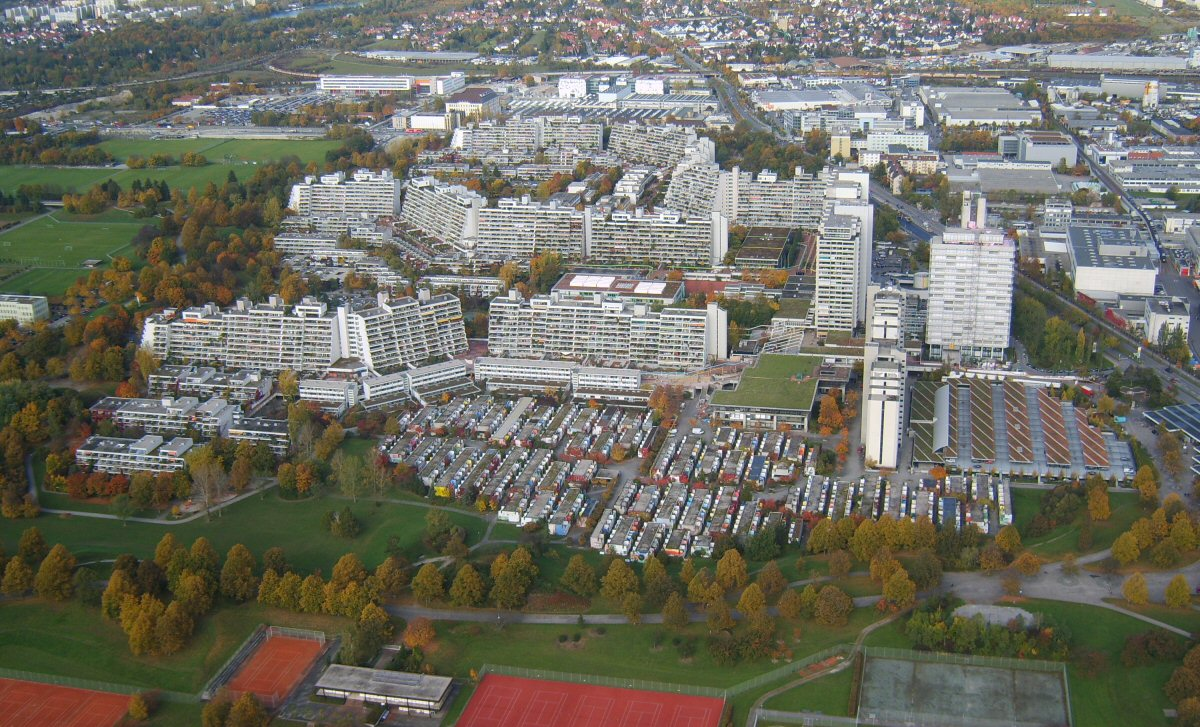
Olympic Village, Studentenviertel Oberwiesenfeld und ZHS

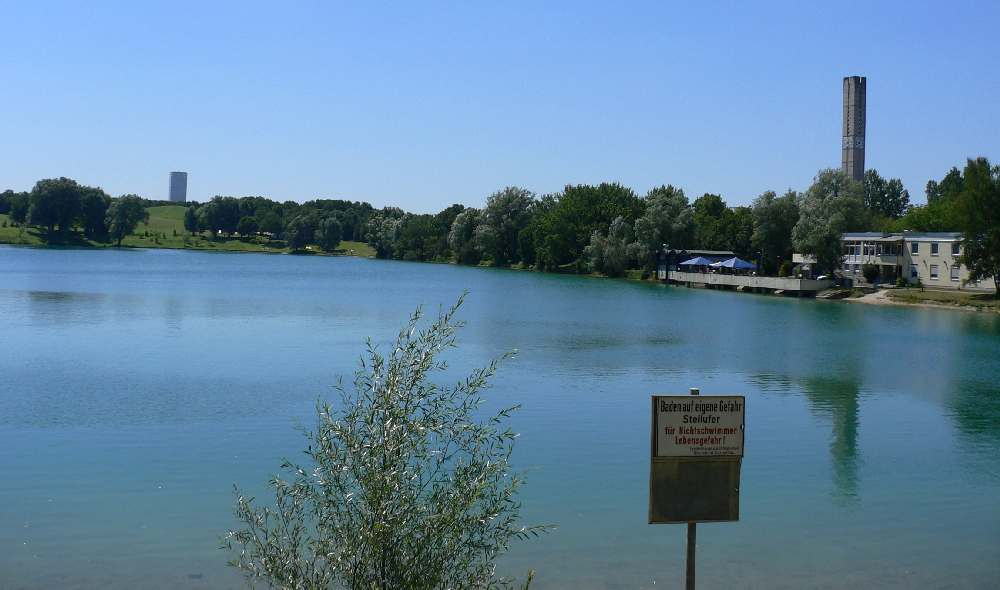
Lerchenauer See
