= Helene-Mayer-Ring =

Street in Munich, Germany

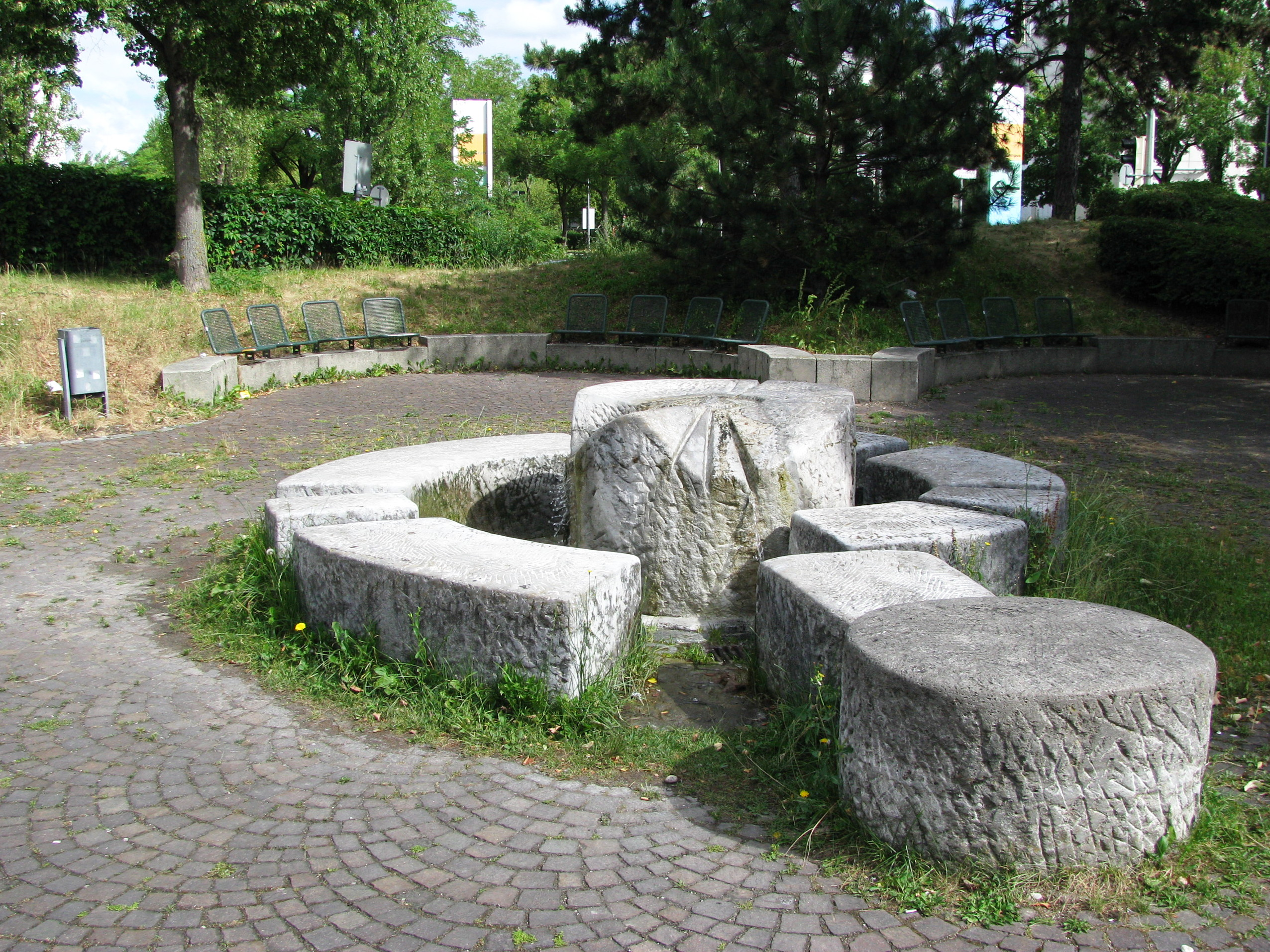
- Steinquader fountain (Wolfgang Zacharias), Helene-Mayer-Ring / corner Lerchenauer Straße
- Interactive map of Helene-Mayer-Ring
- Location: Olympic Village of the Olympic Park Munich in Munich, Germany

Other
- Known for: Named after the Olympic fencing champion Helene Mayer

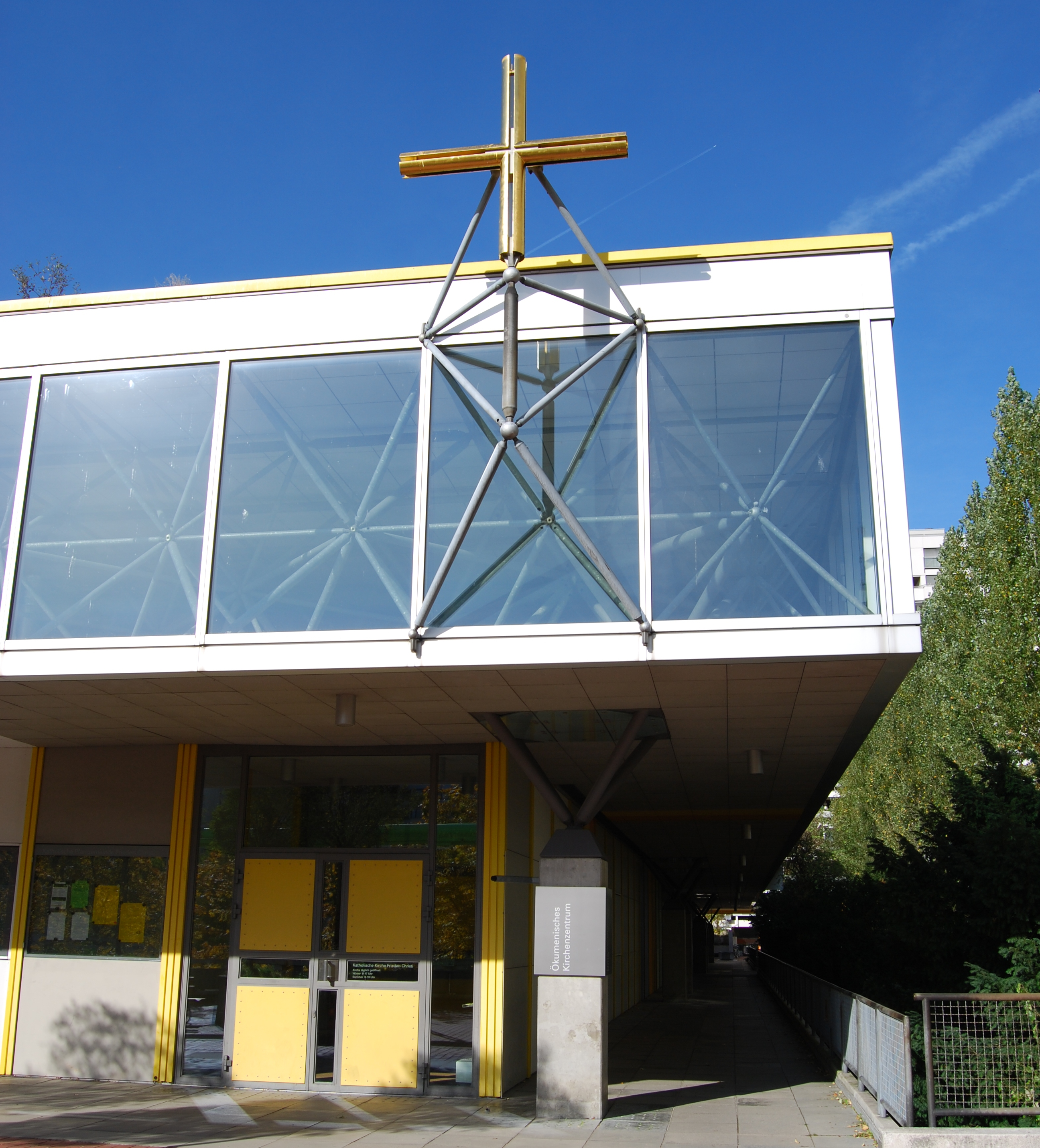
Ecumenical Church Center on Helene-Mayer-Ring

The Helene-Mayer-Ring is a street in the Olympic Village of the Olympic Park Munich in Munich, Germany.

== Description ==
The Helene-Mayer-Ring is named after the Olympic fencing champion Helene Mayer. The road is accessible to pedestrians on the surface and underground for motorists.

The Helene-Mayer-Ring is the shopping street of the village with 36 shops, designed and occupied by the Olywelt eG u.a. who became engaged through buying stores. At the Helene-Mayer-Ring 4, stands the 88-meter-high Olympia Tower, on Helene-Mayer-Ring 10 another tower block with a height of 70 meters. At the Helene-Mayer-Ring 23/25 lies the Ecumenical Church Center of the Olympic Village.

To the east, the Helene-Mayer-Ring joins Lerchenauer Straße and in the west the Connollystraße branches off.
