= Connollystraße =

Street in Munich, Germany

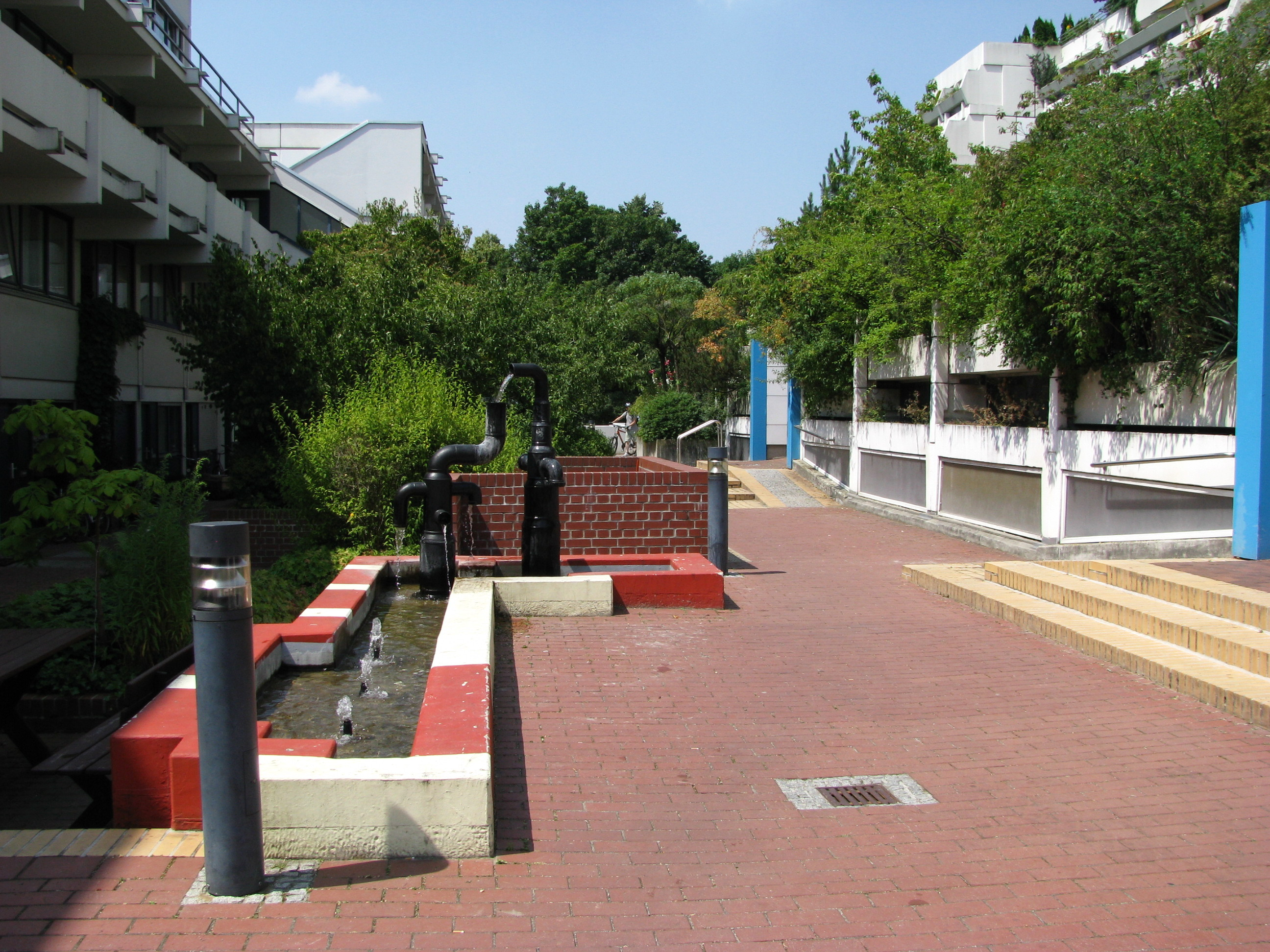
Connollystraße with a fountain

The Connollystraße is a street in the Olympic Village and student quarter of the Olympic Park Munich.

== Description ==
The street was named in 1971 after James Brendan Connolly, the first Olympic champion of the modern era (1896).

It leads from the Helene-Mayer-Ring to the Kusocinskidamm to Straßbergerstraße. The road is accessible on the surface for pedestrians and cyclists, and underground for motorists. Access is via the Lerchenauer Straße.

The sculpture "Olympic Rings" from 1972 by Ruth Kiener flame, with the new version from 2000 by Peter Schwenk, is found here. In Connollystraße 20, is the "Theater Unterwegs".

Connollystraße 31 was the ground-floor, left-side apartment where the Israeli Olympic team was taken hostage during the 1972 Summer Olympics. Following the Olympic Games, initial designs were in discussion to make it a "House of peace", but the building was given to the Max Planck Society, which uses it as a guest house. 200 meters south is the memorial place of the Olympia attack.

North of the Connollystraße is the Nadisee, in the west the Central University Sports Center.

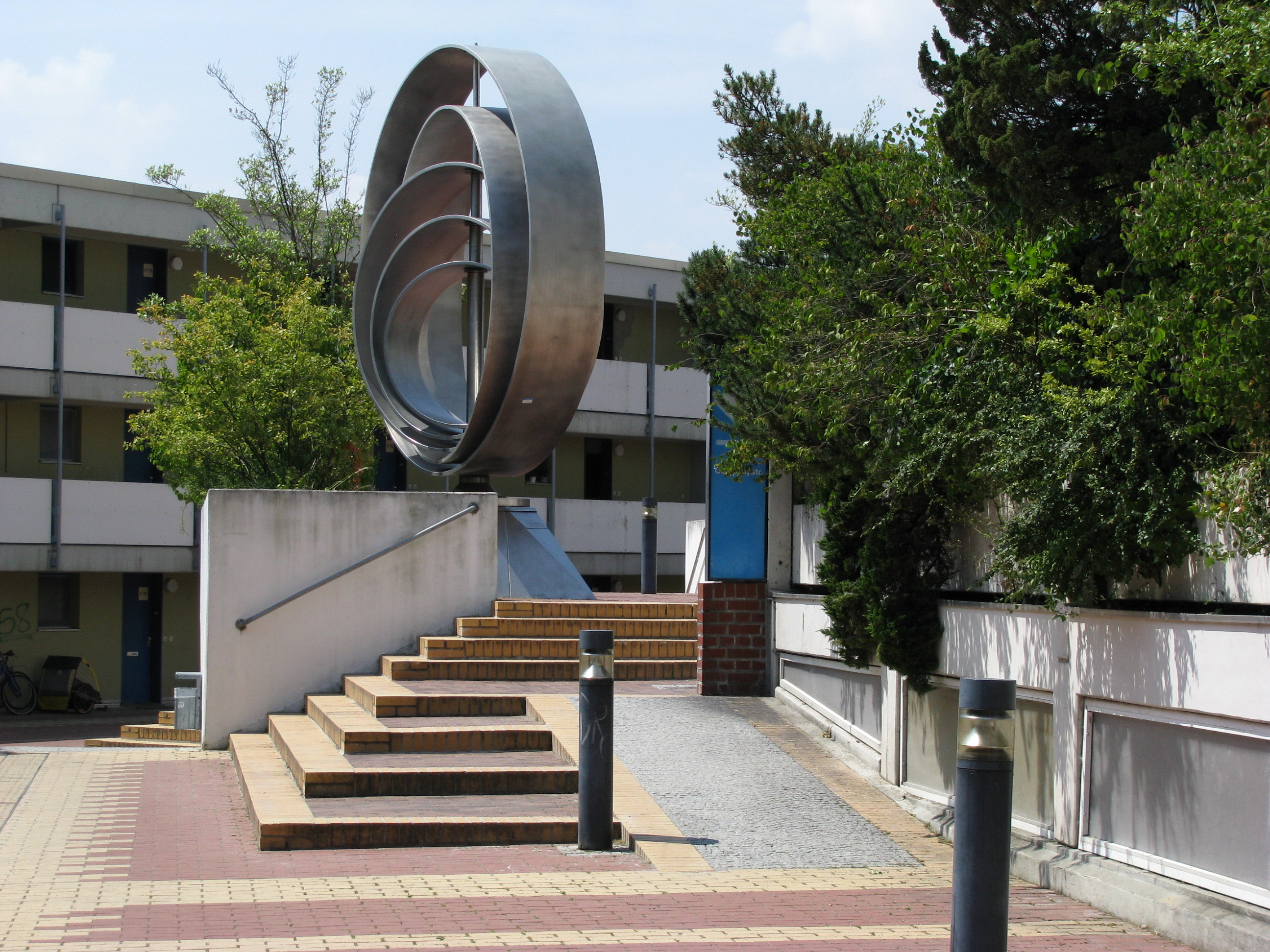
Sculpture "Olympic rings"

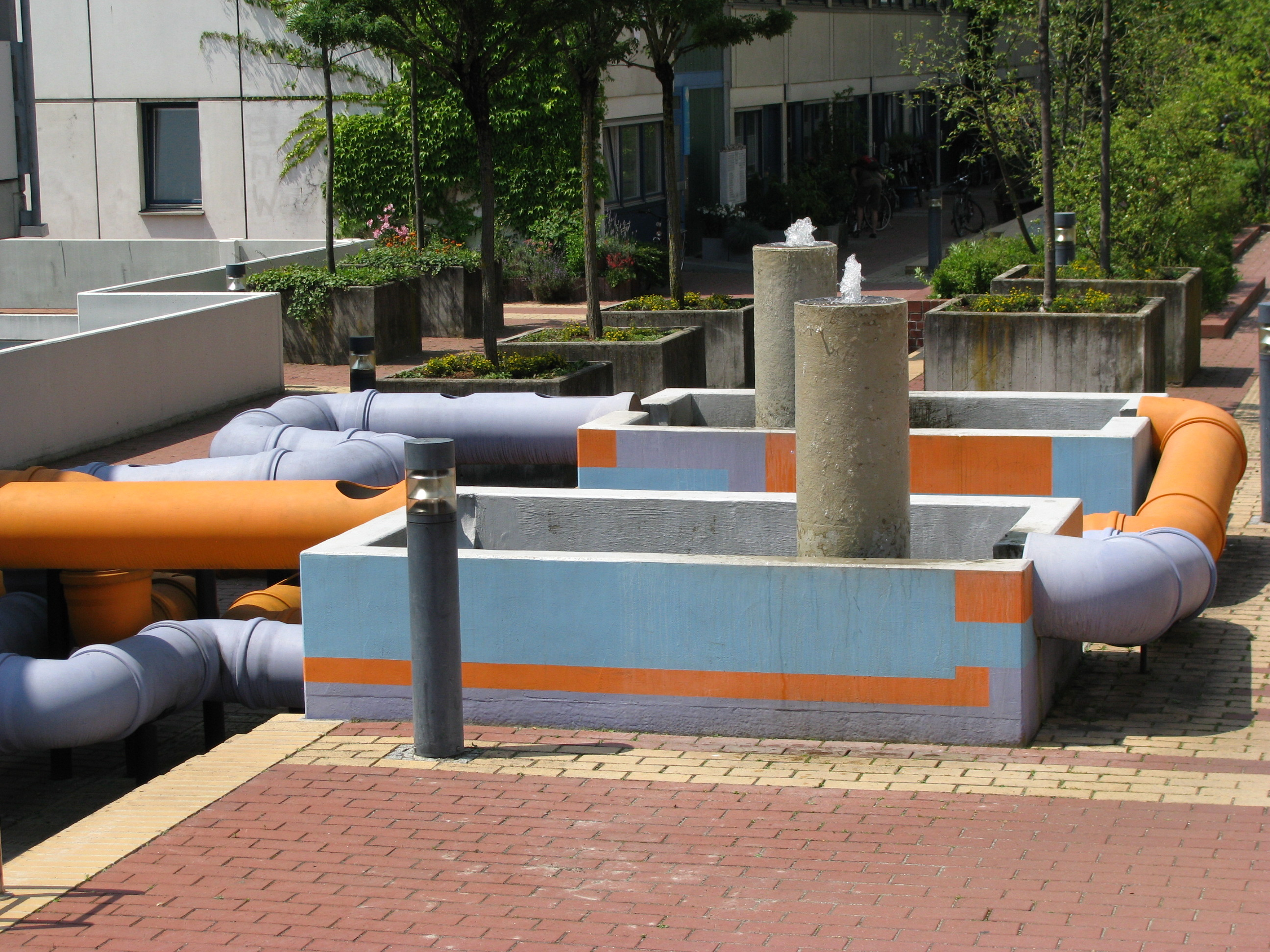
Fountains on Connollystraße

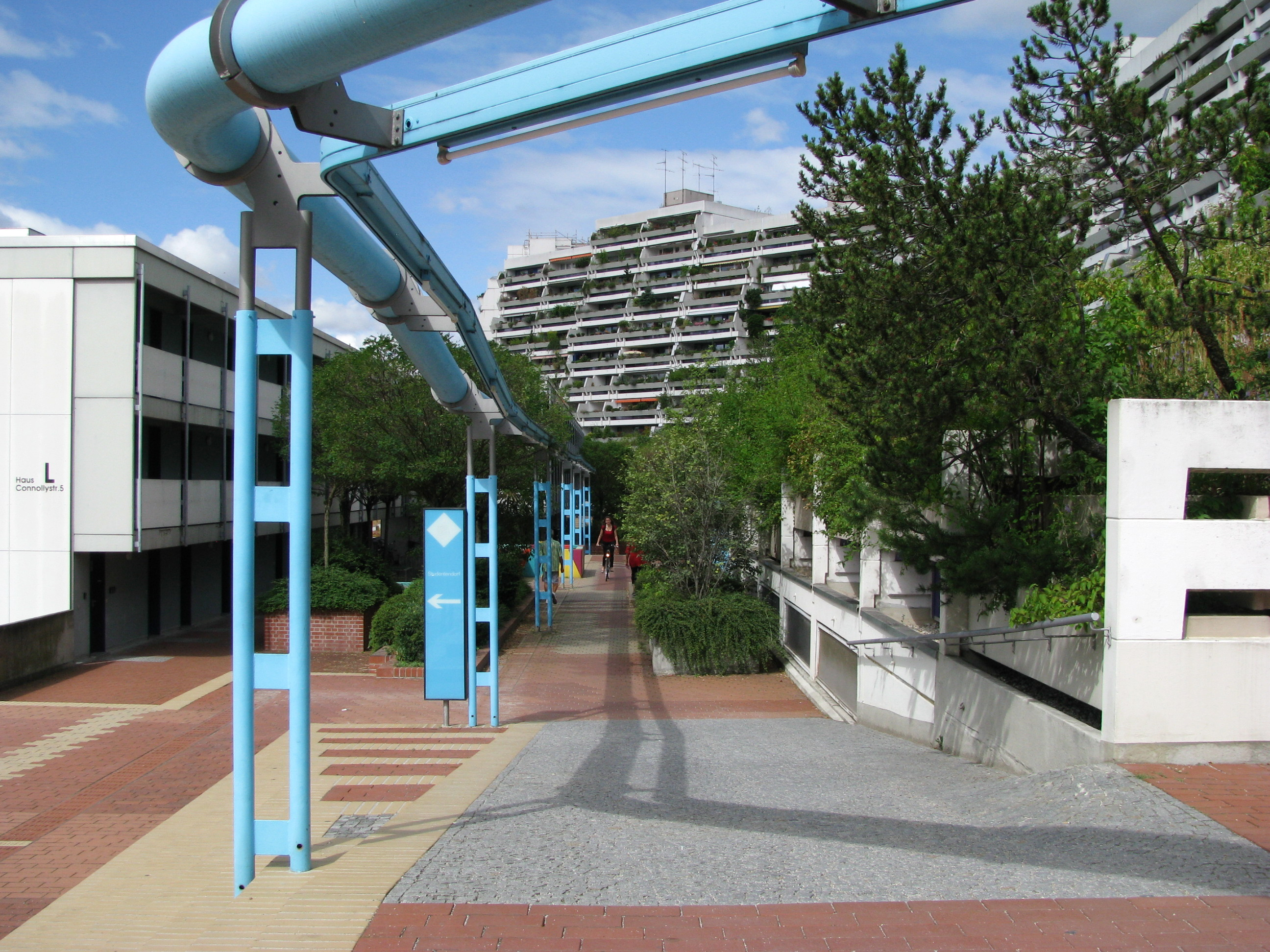
Connollystraße above ground for pedestrians and cyclists

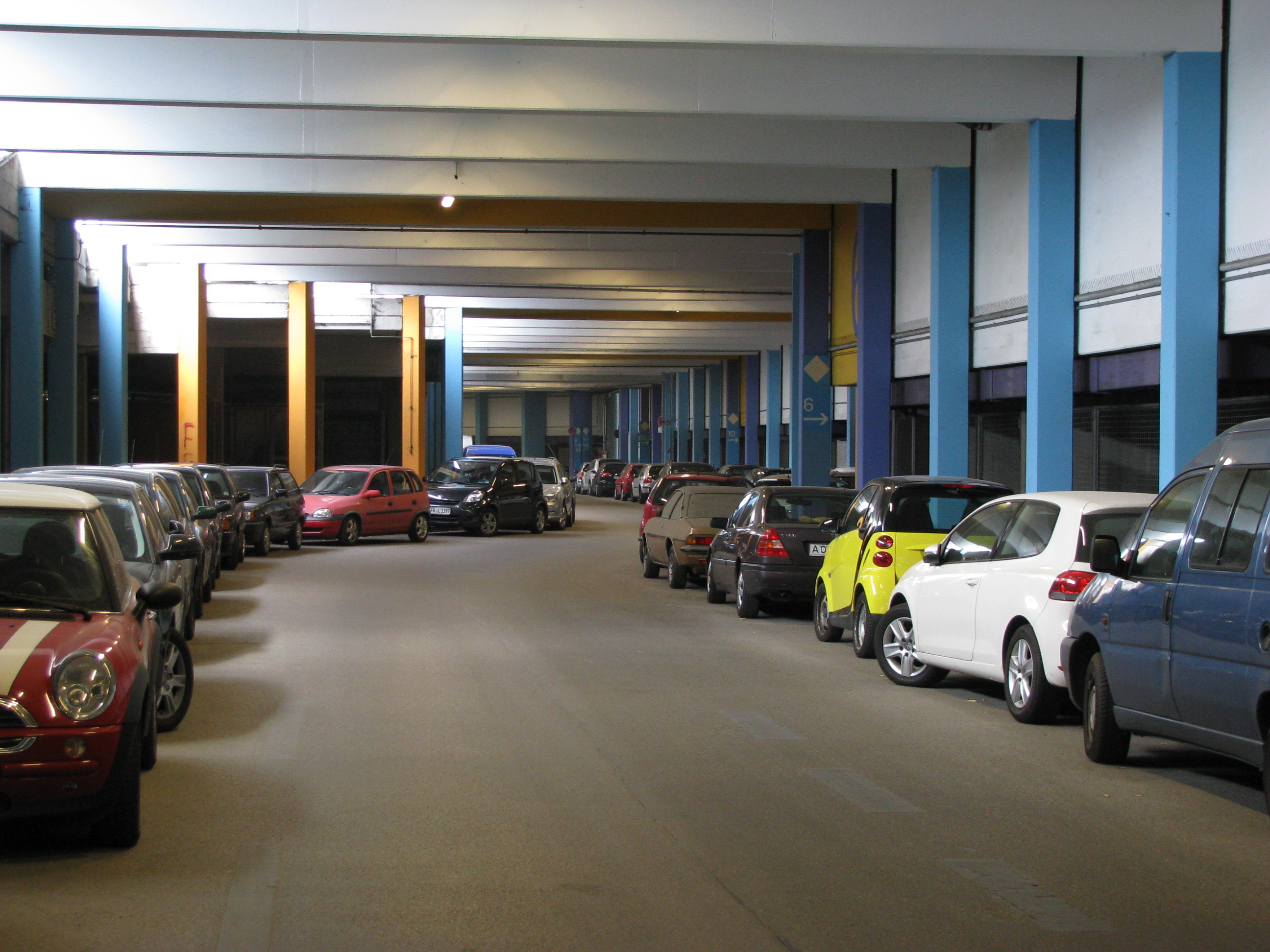
Connollystraße underground car parking garage

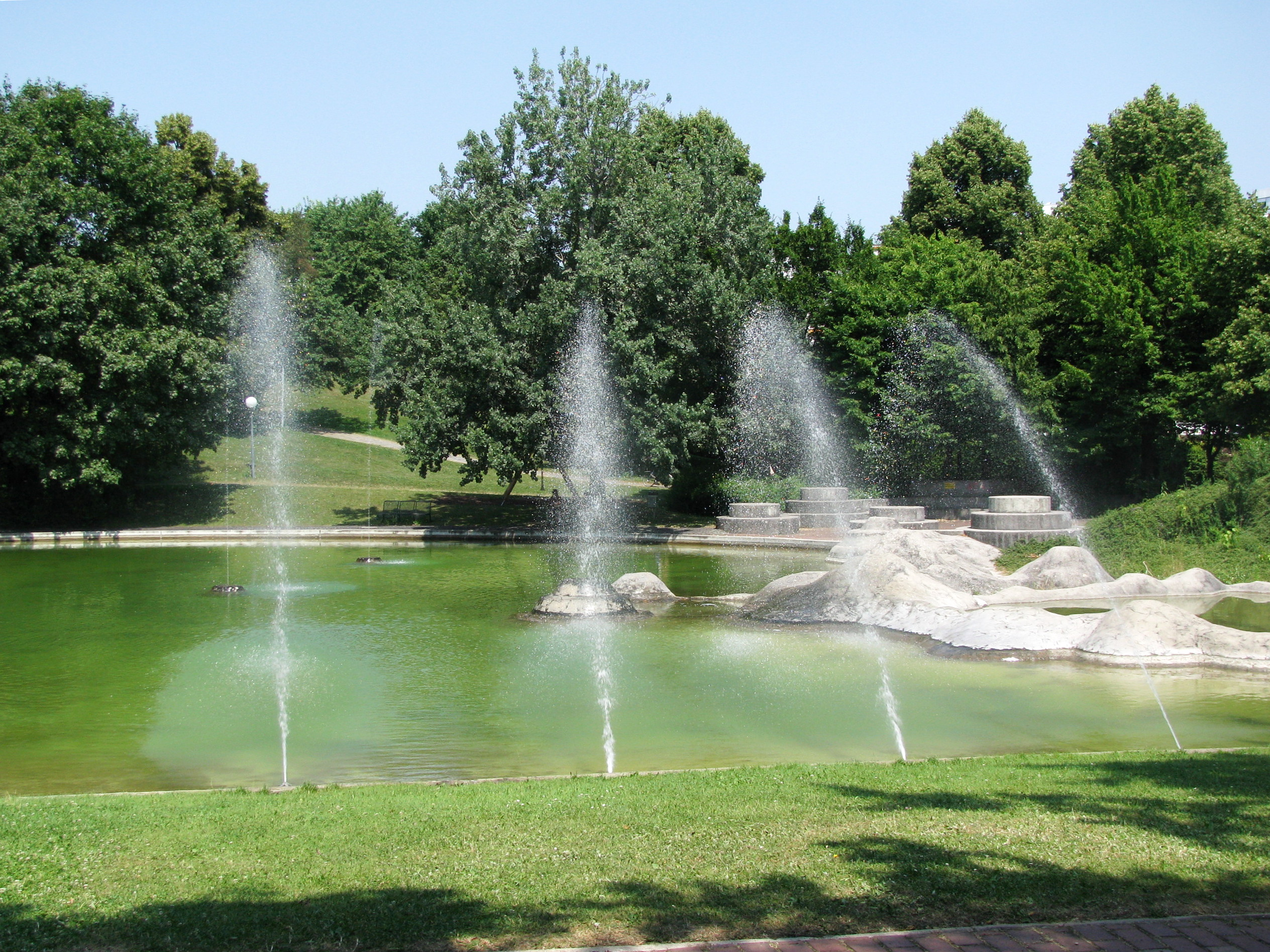
Nadisee

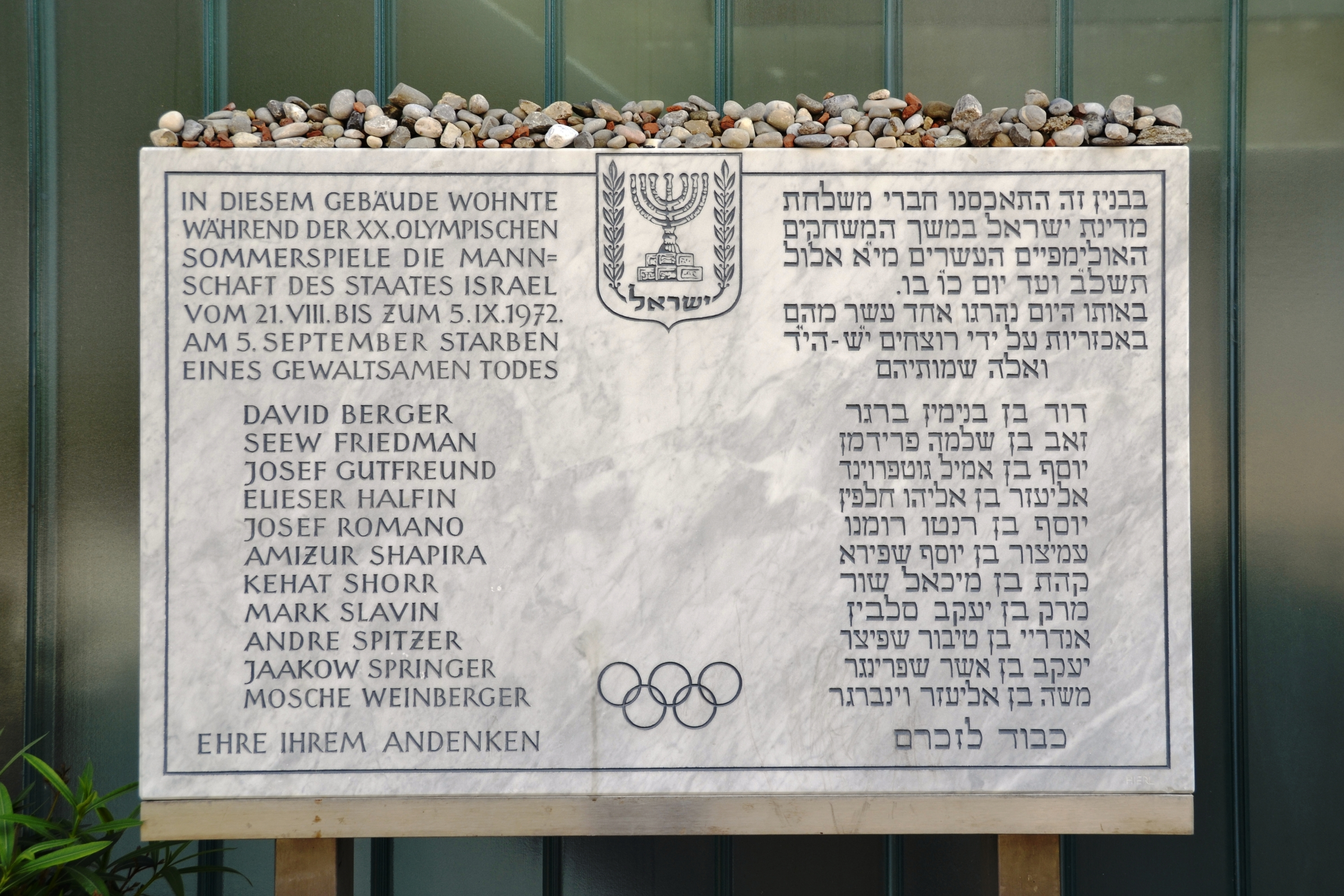
Commemorative plaque at the entrance of Connollystraße 31 (see 1972 Munich massacre)

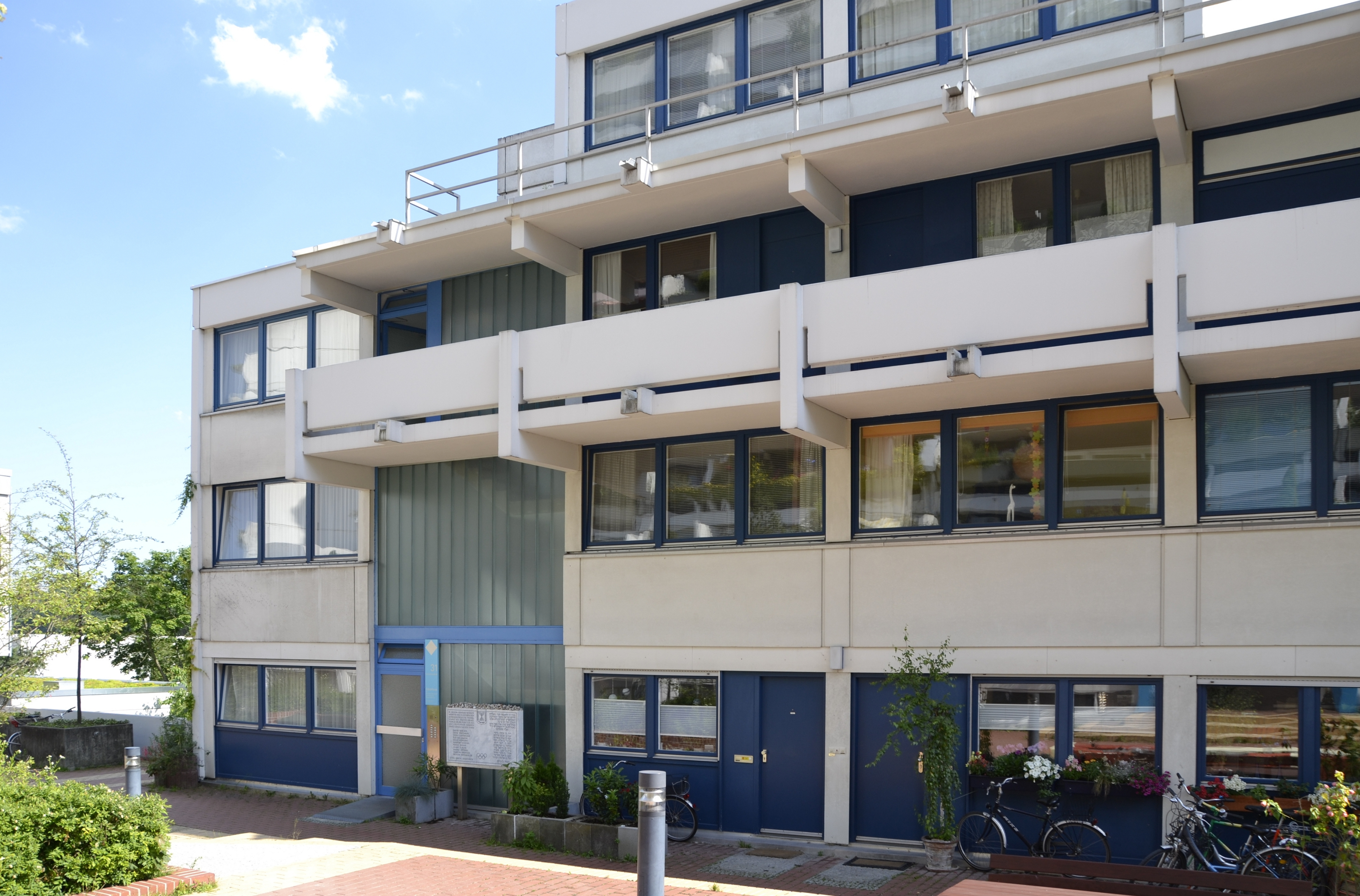
Front view and entrance of the apartment building Connollystraße 31 in 2012. A memorial plaque is visible to the right of the front door

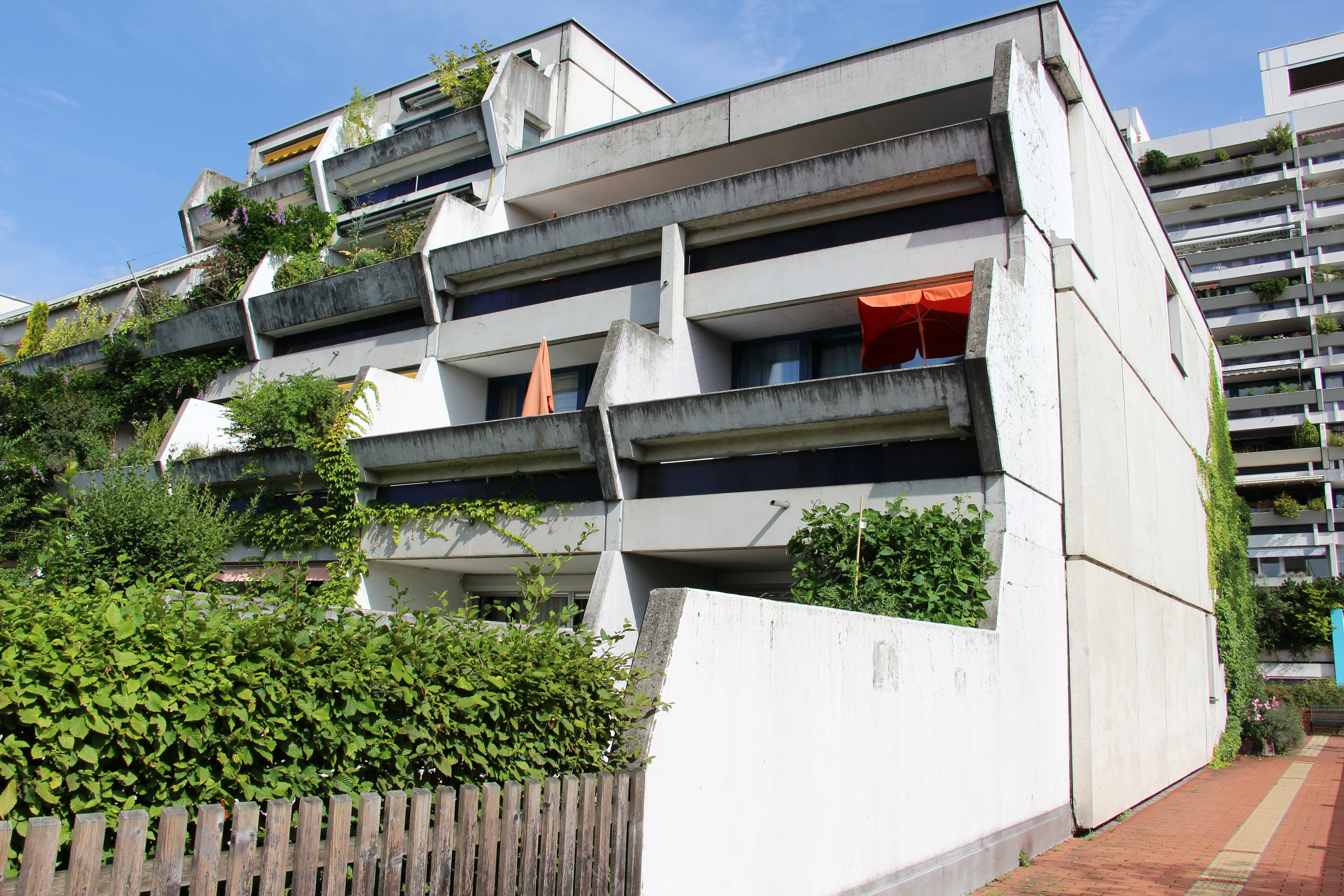
Rear view of the apartment building at Connollystraße 31 in 2017

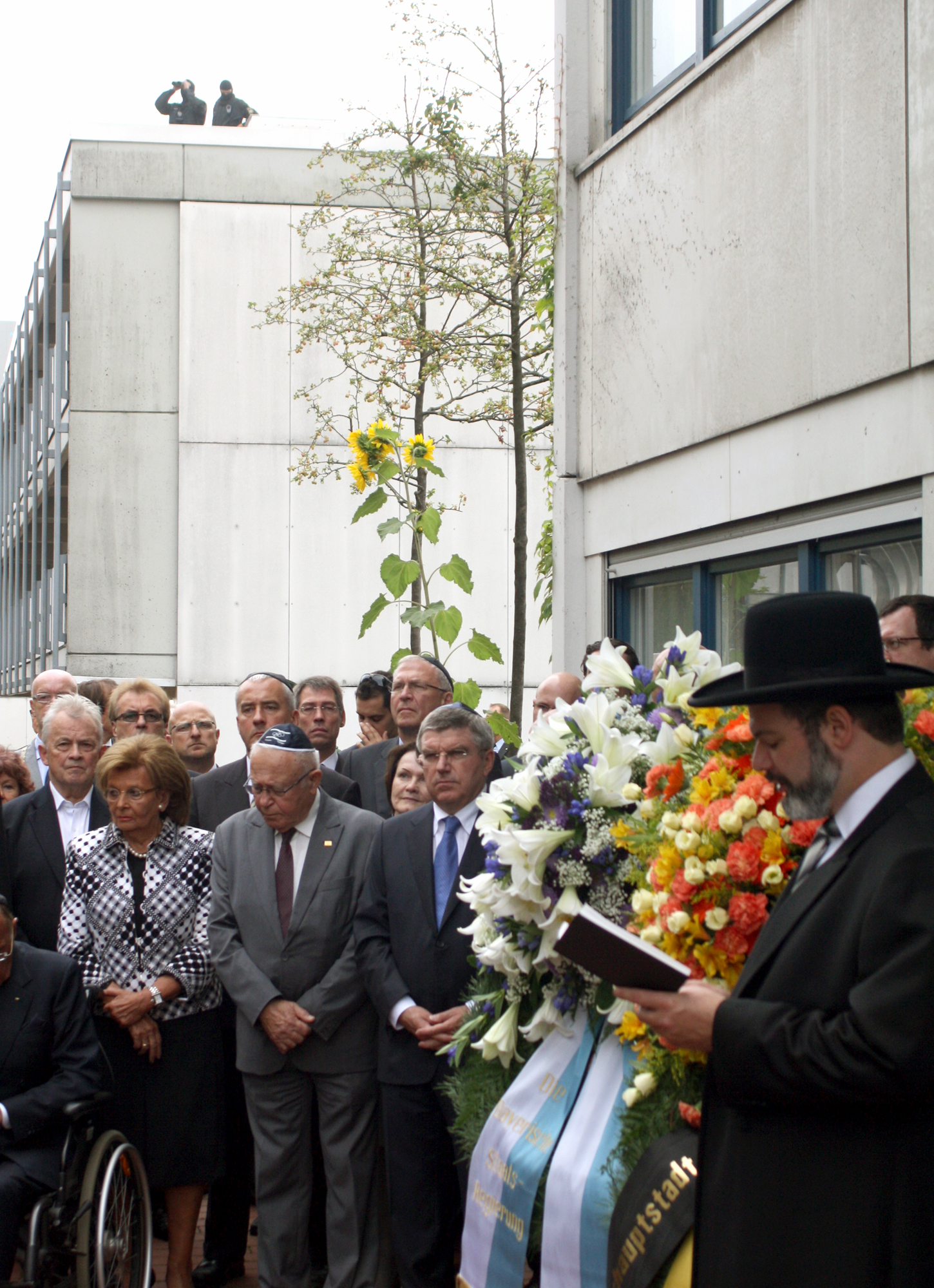
Commemoration ceremony of German and Israeli delegates with a wreath laying on 5 September 2012, under the watch of the German Police SEK positioned on the rooftop, in front of the Connollystraße 31 building

== Movies ==
- "Architektur im Spiegel der Gesellschaft"
