= Nadisee =

Lake in Munich

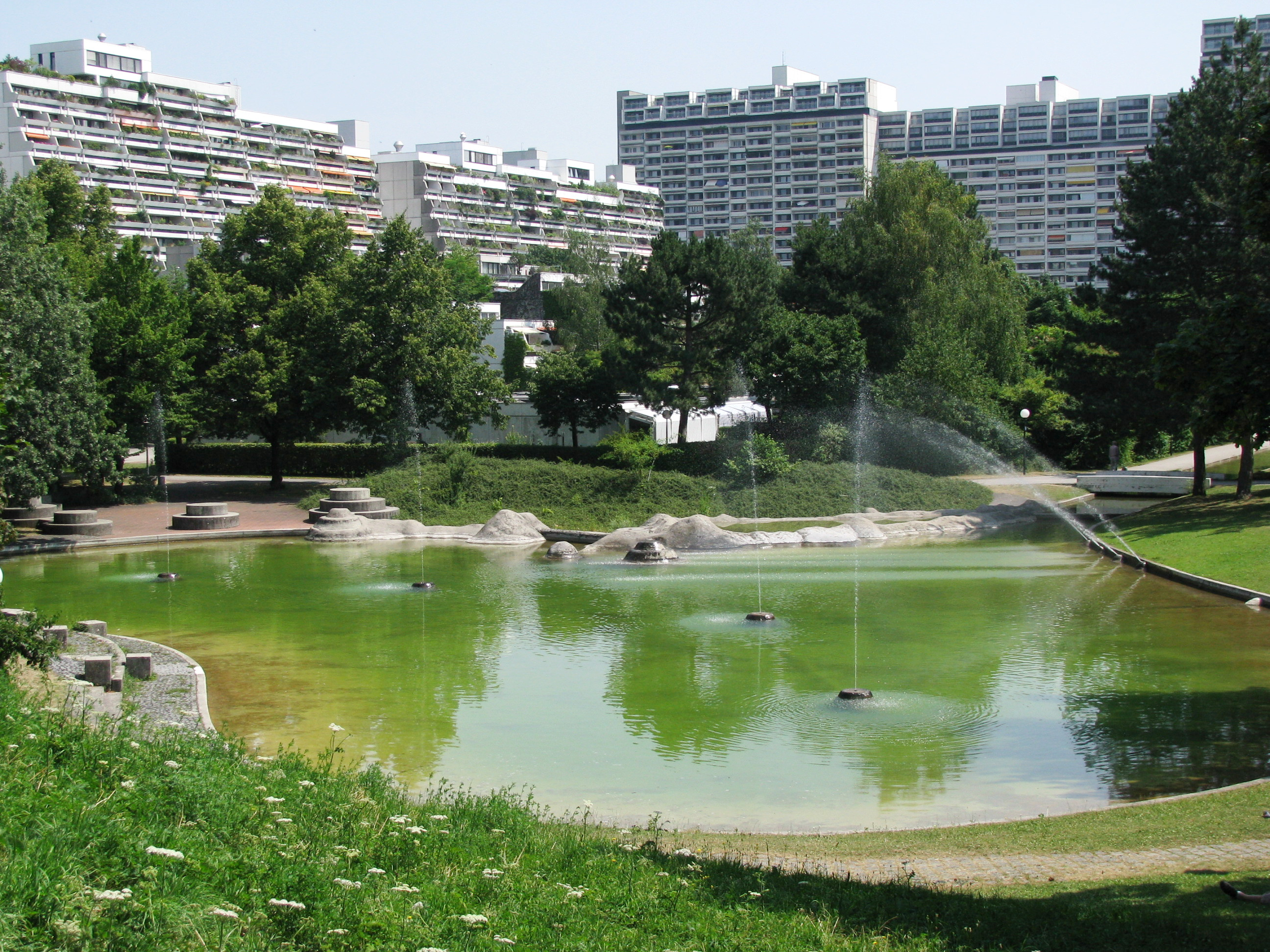

- Location within Germany
- Location: Munich, Bavaria, Germany
- Coordinates: 48°10′51″N 11°32′53″E
- Type: Lake
- Max. length: 50 m (160 ft)
- Max. width: 80 m (260 ft)
- Surface area: 0.16 ha (0.40 acres)

The Nadisee is an urban lake with an integrated system at Munich's Olympic Village precinct, inside the Am Riesenfld area localized at the Milbertshofen-Am Hart district.

With an area of about 0.16 hectares (0.40 acres), it is Munich's smallest bathing lake. The approximate extent in the north–south direction is 50 metres (160 ft), and in the east–west direction 80 metres (260 ft). It was built together with the Olympic Village for the 1972 Summer Olympics and is located between Nadistraße and Connollystraße. The Nadisee, named after the road, which also referees to the Italian athlete Nedo Nadi, is a shallow proof and the water level doesn't go over an adults knees at any point making it suitable for wading by children and families during the summer months and for ice skating in winter months. Occasionally, festivals and parties take place at the lake. When the water is drained for cleaning, the empty concrete tub is used by mountain bikers and, of course, by skateboarders.
