= Olympic Village, Munich =

Purpose-built athlete settlement in Germany

Coordinates: 48°10′54″N 11°33′3″E

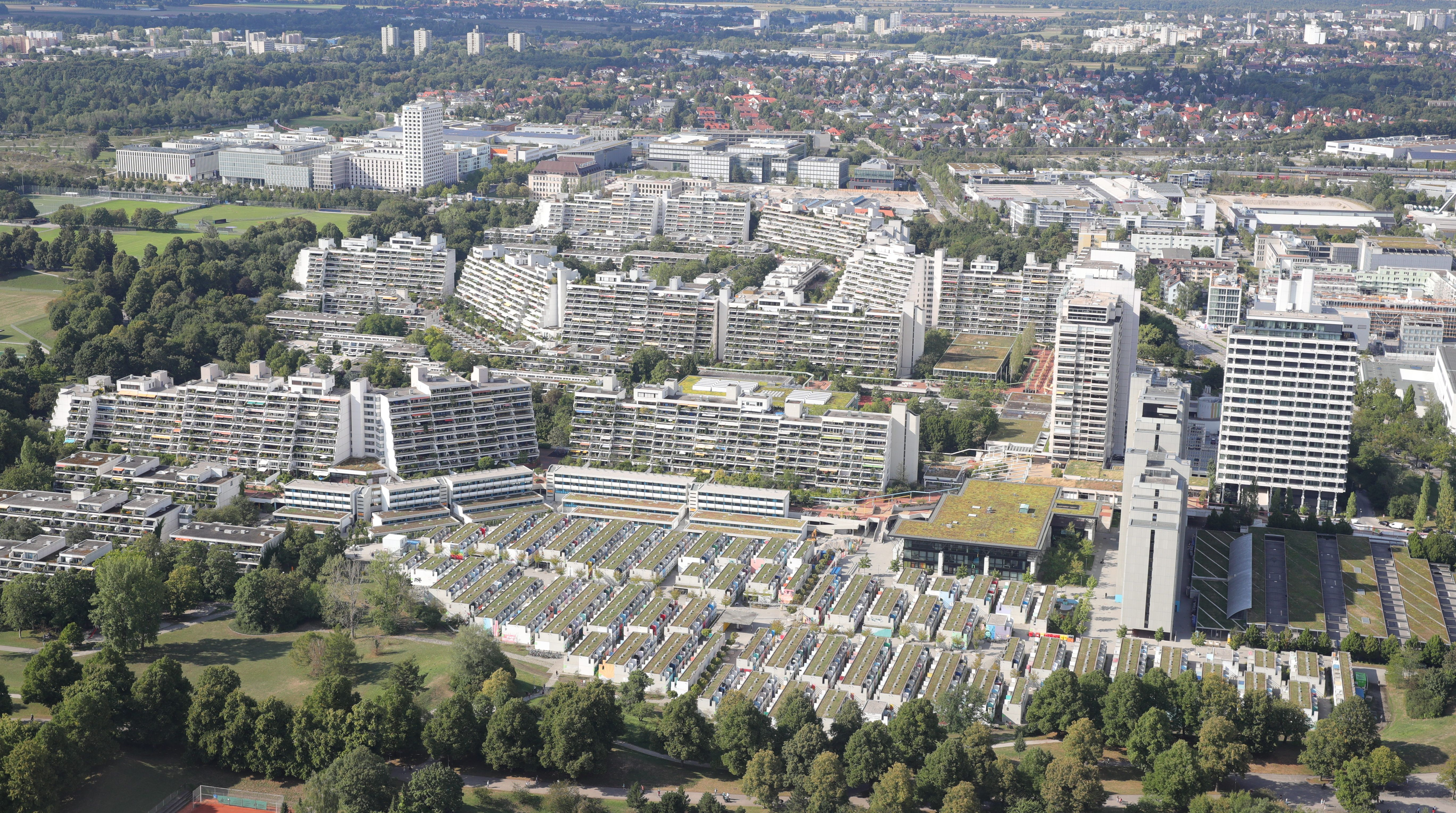
The Olympic Village in Munich as viewed from the Olympic Tower

The Olympic Village (German: Olympisches Dorf) was constructed for the 1972 Summer Olympics in Munich, Germany and was used to house the athletes during the games. The Munich massacre took place in one of its apartment blocks, Connollystraße 31; the street was named for an Irish-American participant in the 1896 Olympics. The Olympic Village is in the north part of the Olympiapark.

On 5 September 1972, the village was the target of the Munich massacre, a terrorist attack by the Black September Organization in which eleven Israeli athletes and one German police officer were killed. Disguised as athletes with stolen keys, eight militants broke into the Israeli Olympic Team's quarters. The group initially killed two athletes and took nine others hostage. The Bavarian Police attempted to rescue the hostages but failed, and all nine hostages were killed. In the crossfire, five members of the Black September Organization were killed, as was one German police officer. The three surviving terrorists were arrested and released the next month as part of a hostage exchange following the hijacking of Lufthansa Flight 615.

Since 1973, the former male section is a neighborhood, and the female area is used as student housing area (German: "Studentenviertel auf dem Oberwiesenfeld" or "Studentendorf"). Some of the areas of this condominium needed to be completely rebuilt after a student revolt. On the night of 4 August 2007, a party turned into a small riot, leading to heavy vandalism and the destruction of two houses by a set fire. 150 police officers were sent to control the situation.

== See also ==
- List of Olympic Villages
- Olympiapark, Munich
- Nadisee
