= BMW Museum =

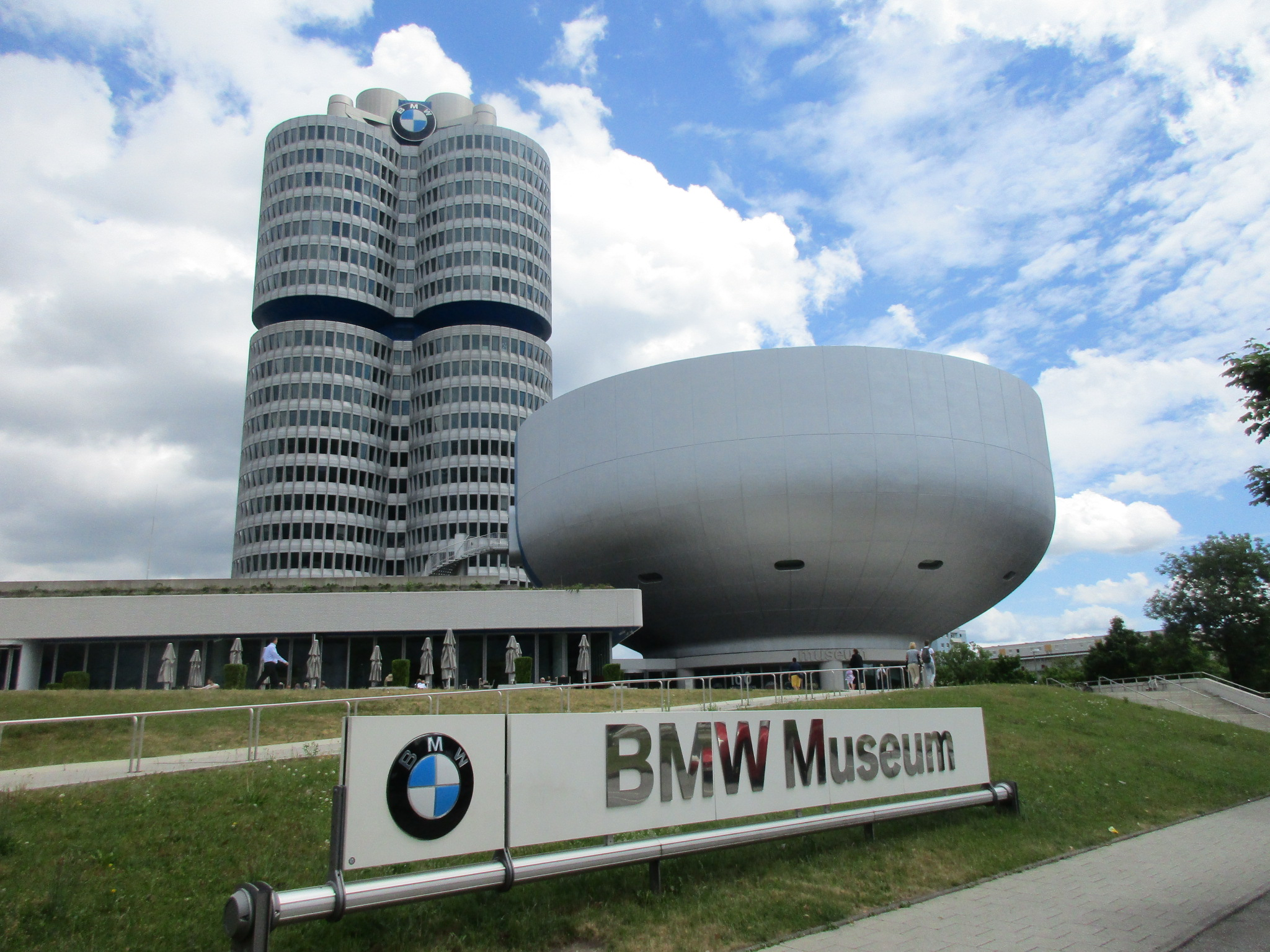
- The museum building
- Type: corporate museum
- Collection size: 120 exhibits
- Curator: the corporation

The BMW Museum is the corporate museum of BMW history and was established in 1973, shortly after the 1972 Summer Olympics opened. From 2004 to 2008, it was renovated in connection with the construction of the BMW Welt, directly opposite. The museum reopened on 21 June 2008. At the moment the exhibition space is 5,000 square meters for the presentation of about 120 exhibits.

== Exhibits ==
The BMW Museum exhibits a permanent collection with affirmative stance and is founded, as well as maintained by BMW. The BMW Museum contextualizes consumer products, in the main BMW automobiles. History, mobility, and place are the basis for the BMW Museum's exhibition strategy. BMW claims, that the BMW Museum is "a fixture of Munich culture" on a par with the Deutsches Museum and the Neue Pinakothek.

== Architecture and design ==
The museum shows BMW's technical development throughout the company's history. It contains engines and turbines, aircraft, motorcycles, and vehicles in a plethora of possible variations. In addition to actual models there are futuristic-looking, even conceptual studies from the past 20 years.

Known as the salad bowl or white cauldron, the silver futuristic building was designed by the architect of the BMW Headquarters, the Viennese professor Karl Schwanzer. The roughly circular base is only 20 meters in diameter, the flat roof about 40 metres. The entrance is on the ground floor

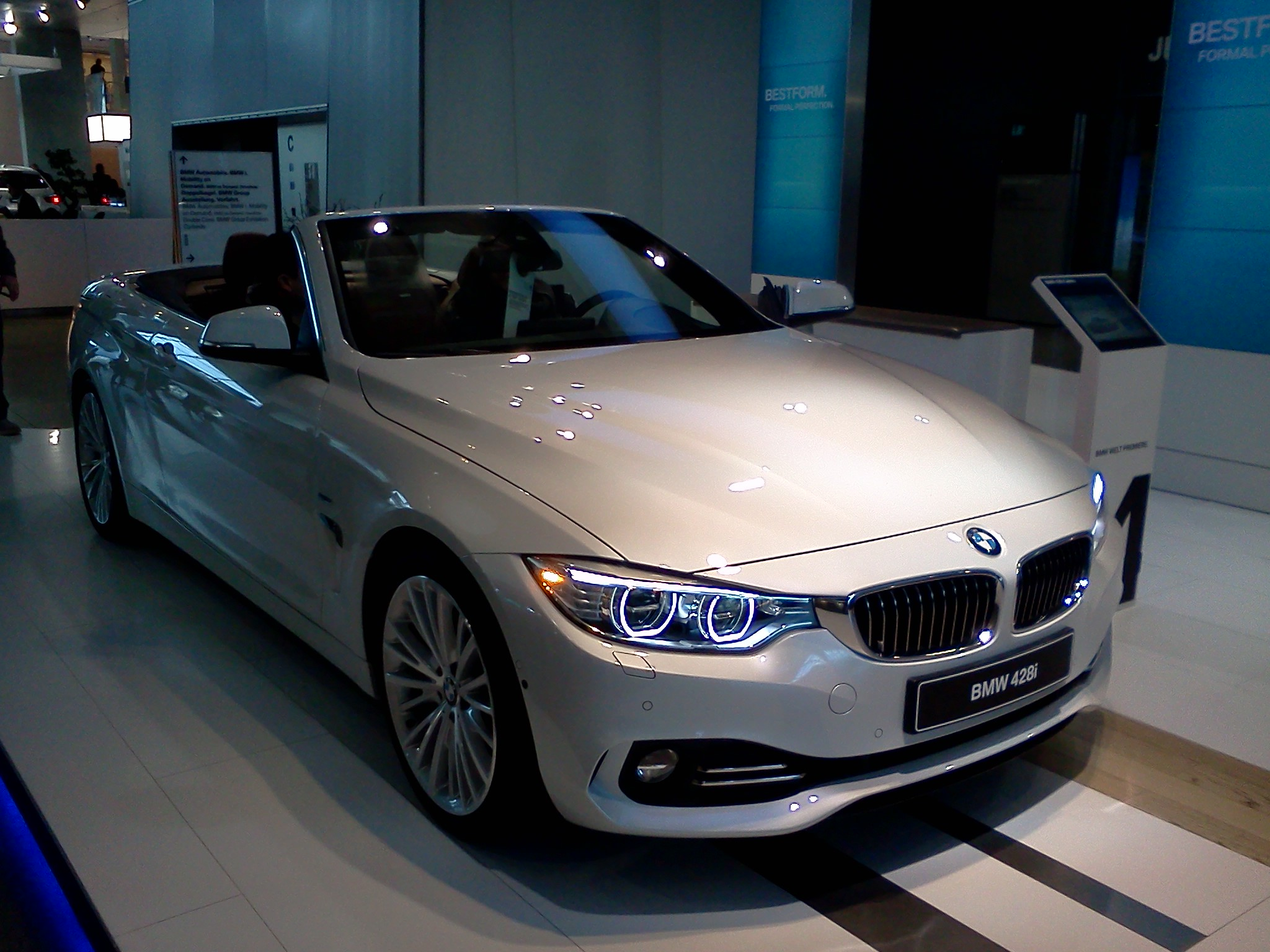
BMW 428i Cabriolet (BMW 4 Series (F32)) at BMW Museum (2014)

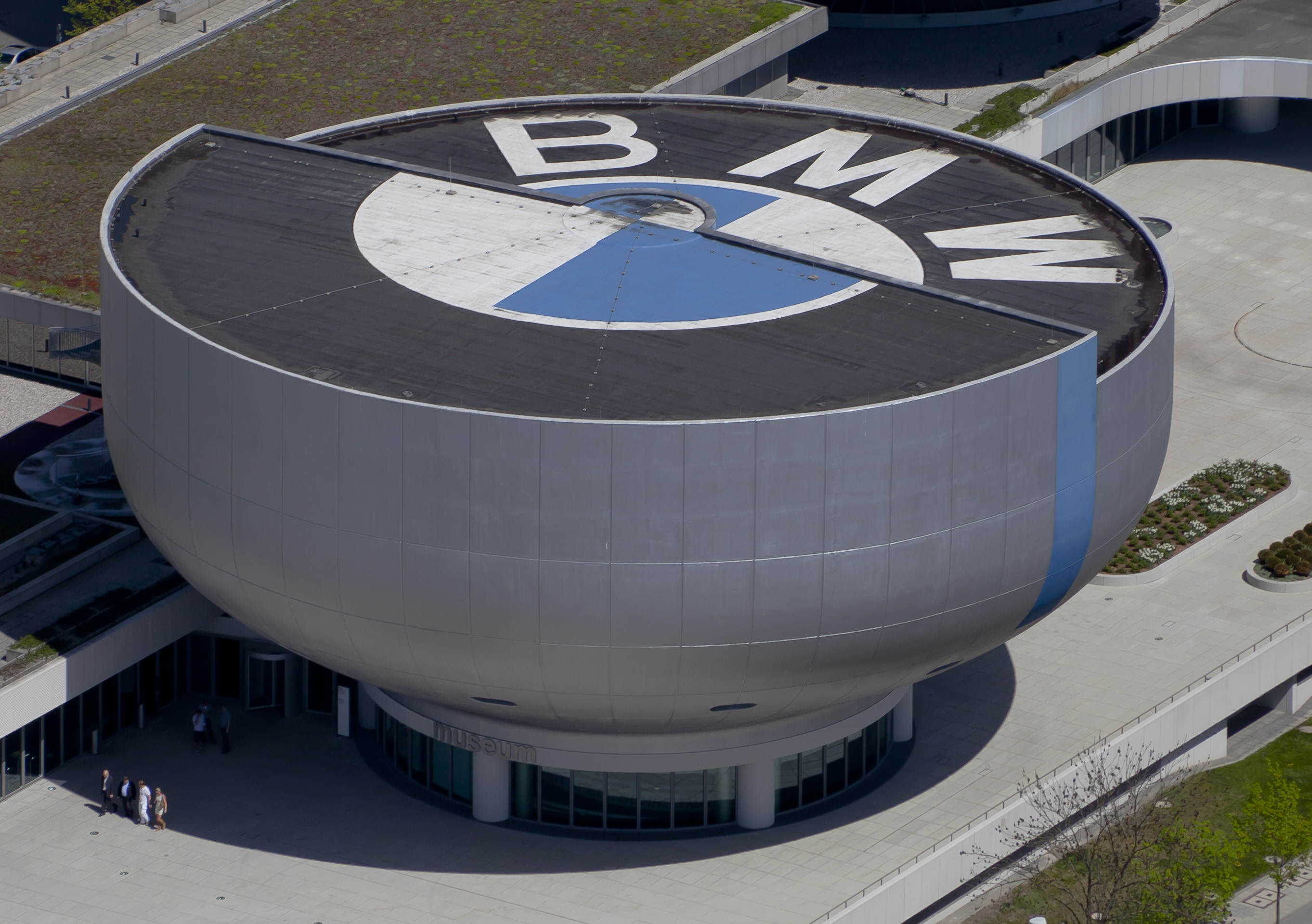
Exterior of the BMW Museum

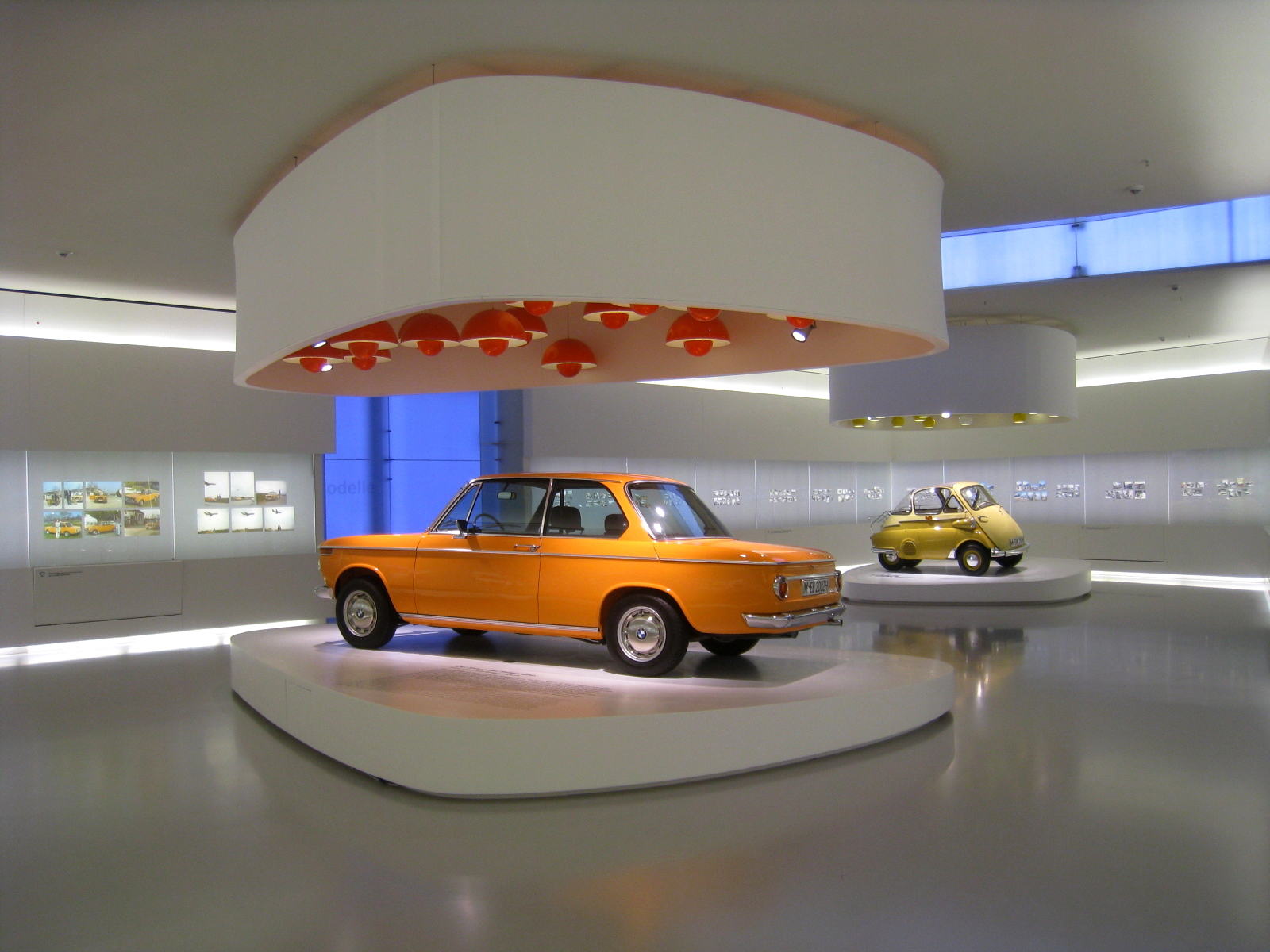
1960s BMW automobiles in the BMW Museum

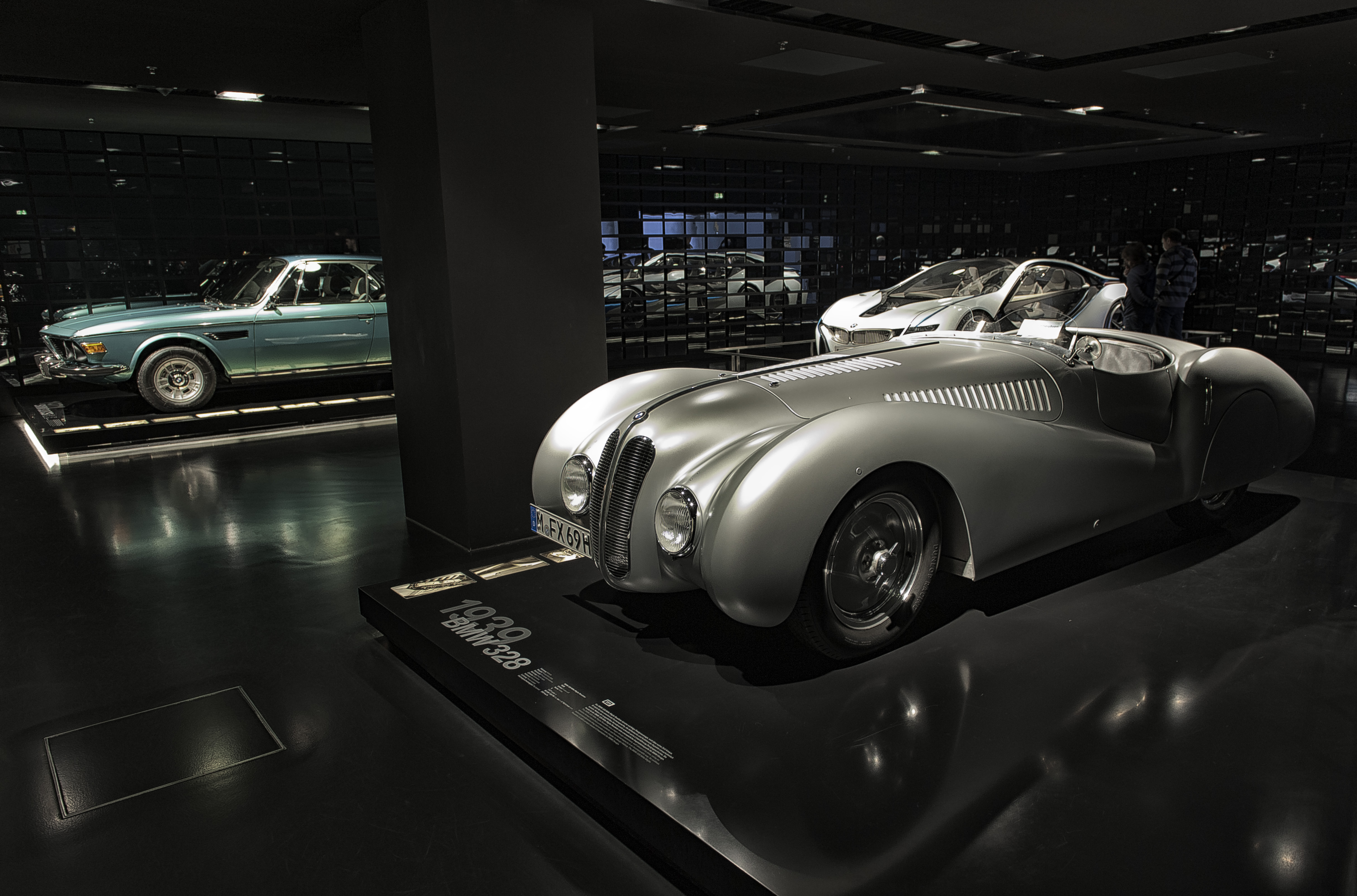
BMW 328 in the BMW-Museum

== See also ==
- List of automobile museums
- Automobilwerk Eisenach
- History of BMW
- BMW Group Classic
- Rolls-Royce Museum
- Mercedes-Benz Museum
- Porsche Museum, Stuttgart
