= BMW Welt =

Building in Munich, Germany

Coordinates: 48°10′37″N 11°33′24″E

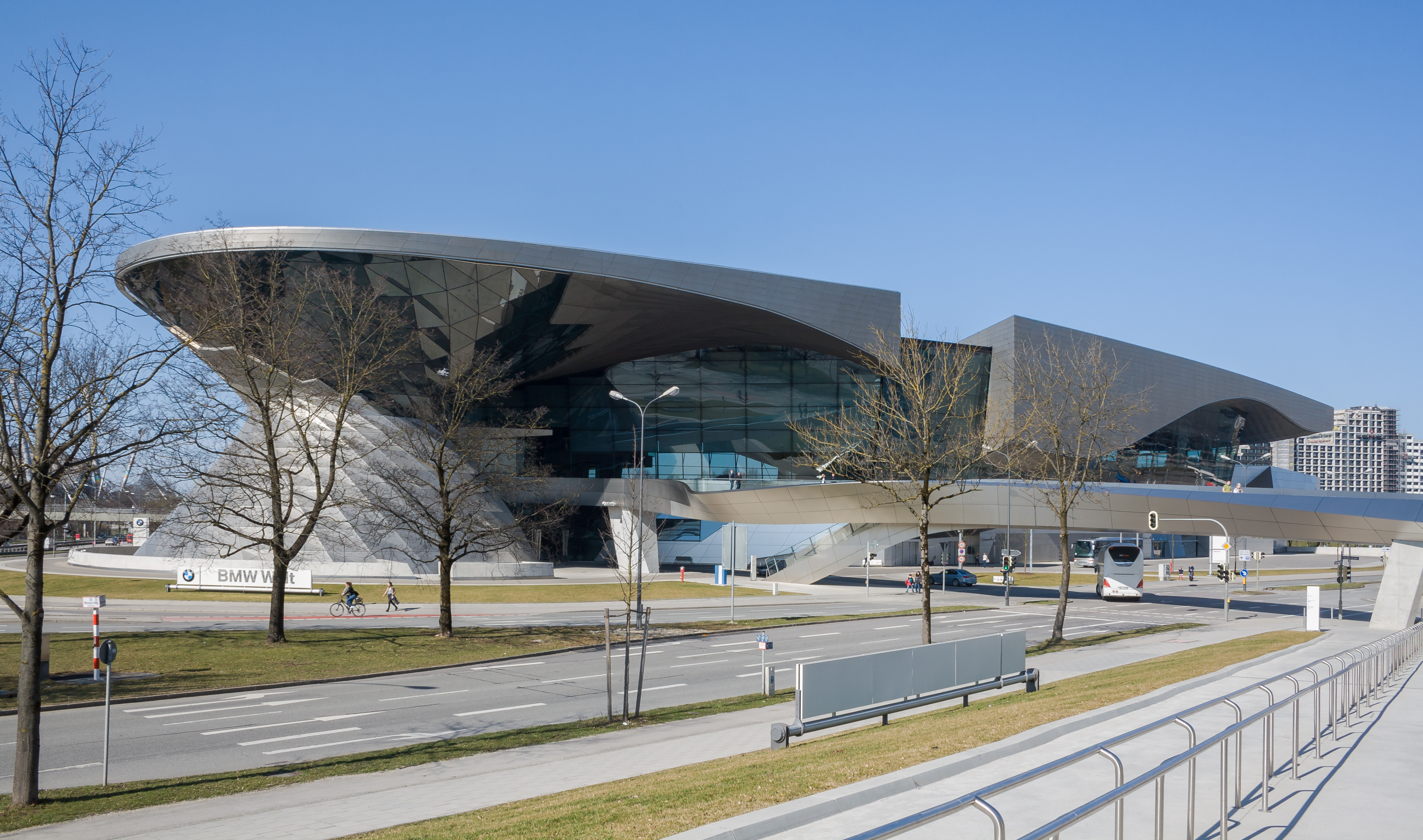
BMW Welt building

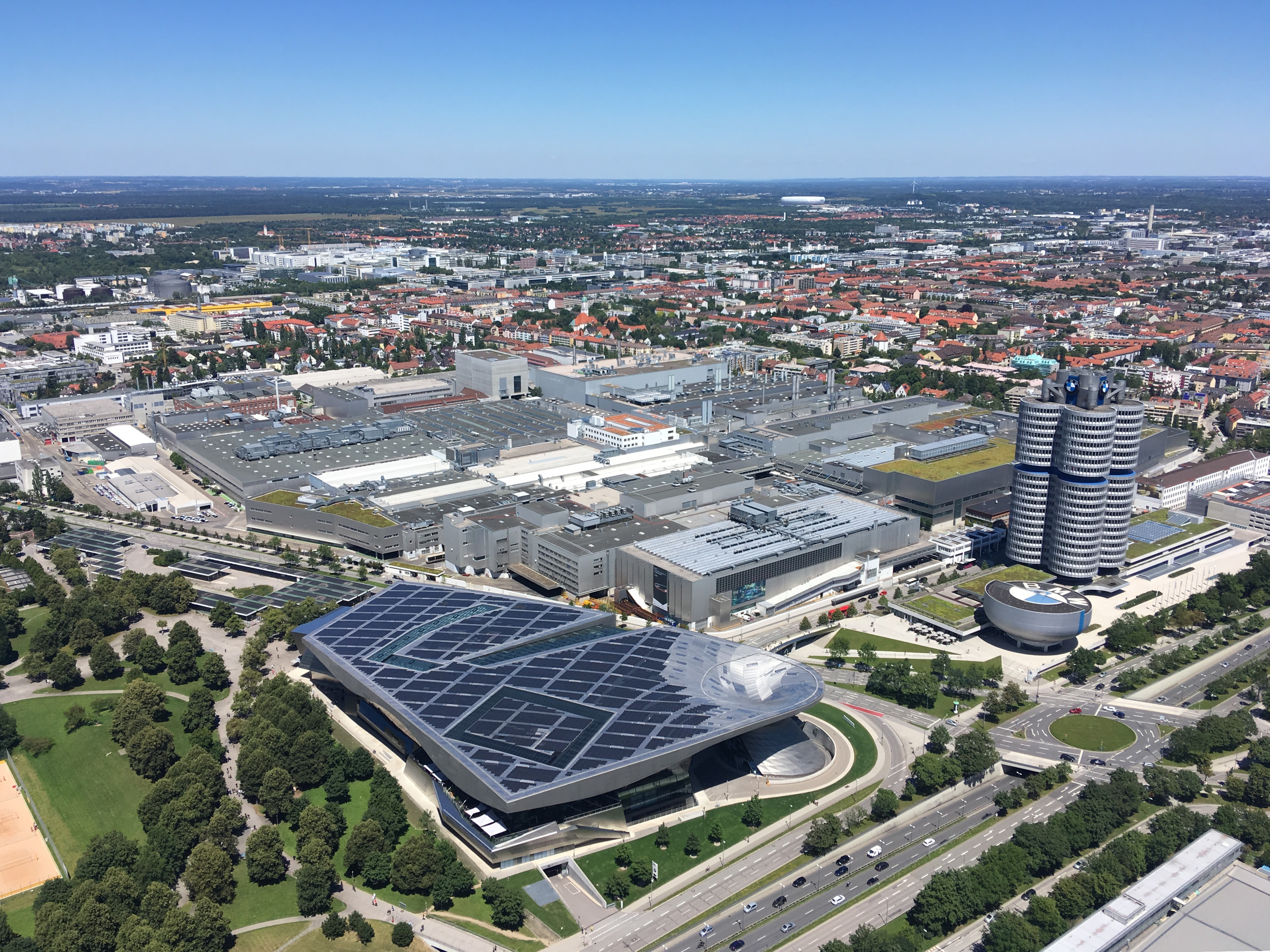
Aerial photograph of the BMW Welt, BMW Museum, BMW Headquarters, and BMW factory

The BMW Welt is a combined exhibition, delivery, adventure museum, and event venue located in Munich's district Am Riesenfeld, next to the Olympic Park, in the immediate vicinity of the BMW Headquarters and factory. It was built from August 2003 to summer 2007. A solar system with 800 kW of power is installed on the roof of the main building. The opening took place on 17 October 2007. The BMW Welt is the most visited tourist attraction in Bavaria.

== Operations ==
BMW Welt operations are coordinated with the other local BMW facilities, the BMW Museum and BMW Headquarters. It has a showroom with the current model lineup of BMW cars and motorcycles, and the other two BMW Group brands, Mini and Rolls-Royce.

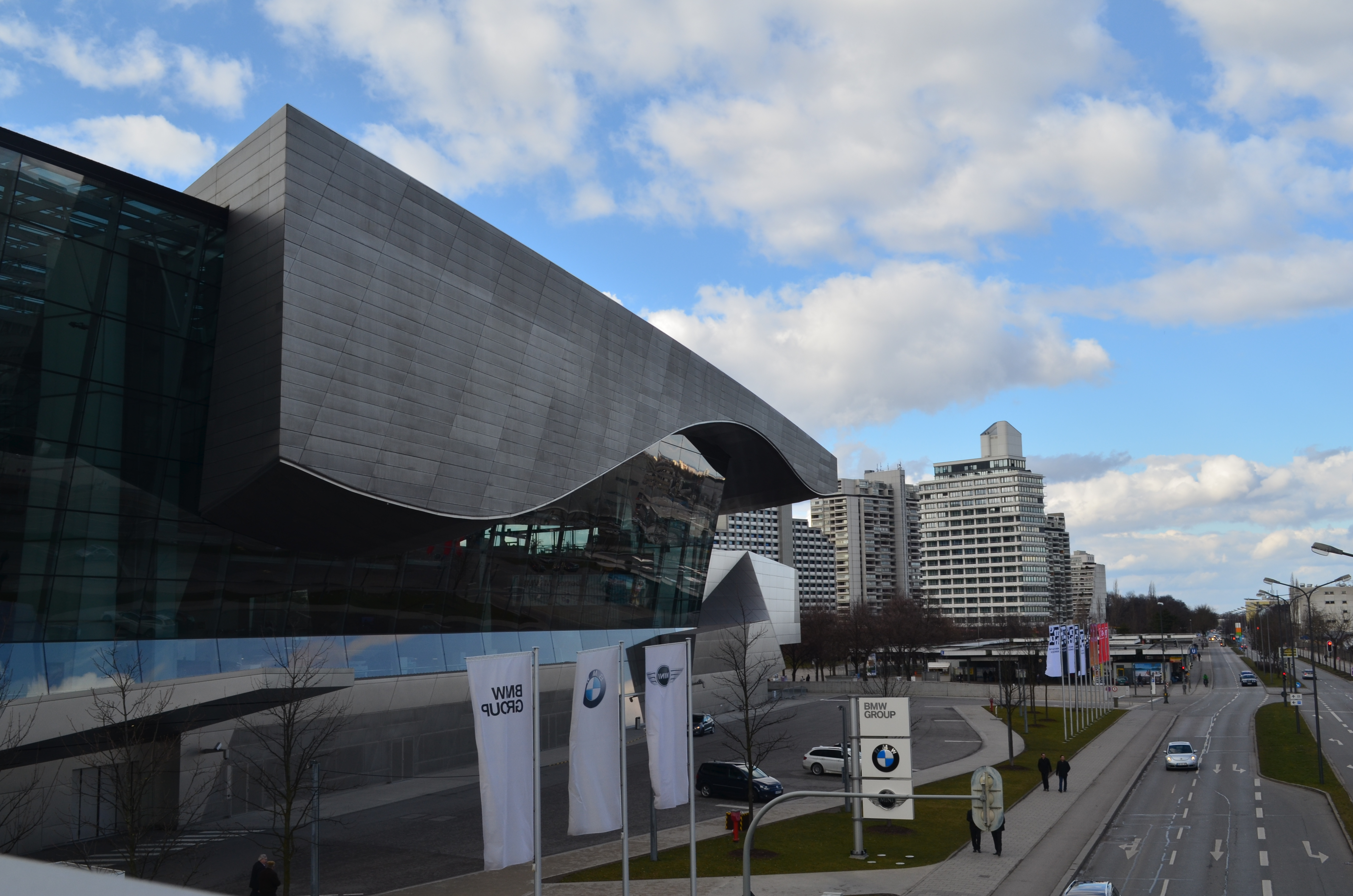
BMW Museum in 2014

Customers picking up special ordered cars are given a dramatic "staged experience" in which they await their new car in an enormous glass-walled hall, and their cars are lifted up from lower levels on round elevator platforms to their respective delivery area. BMW Welt also has shops selling BMW-branded promotional merchandise and accessories, and a restaurant.

== Design and construction ==
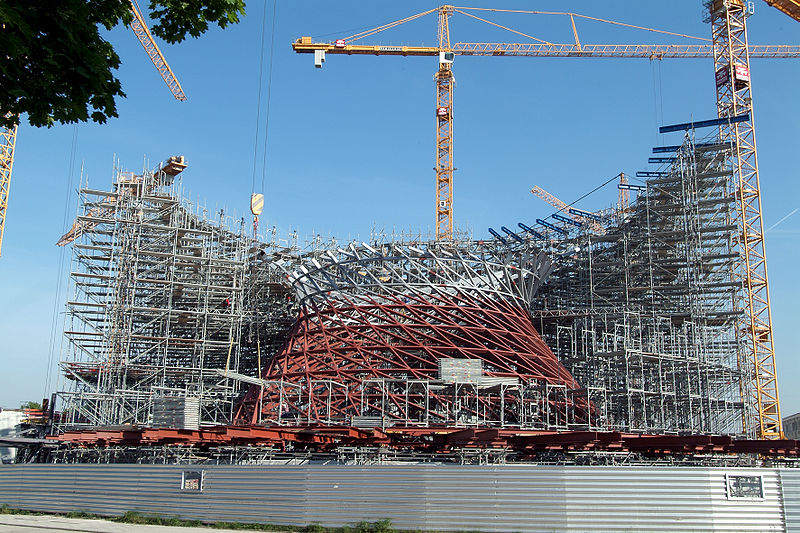
BMW Welt in 2005

In 2001, an international architectural design competition was sponsored by BMW. Twenty-seven offices participated in the competition four of which were awarded prizes. The jury awarded two offices Sauerbruch Hutton and COOP HIMMELB(L)AU first prize and made the recommendation for the competitors to rework their design submissions in a third design phase in order for BMW to determine which office would be awarded the contract.

The contract was awarded to the Vienna-based architects COOP HIMMELB(L)AU and the facility was constructed from August 2003 through summer 2007 at a cost of US$200 million. Originally conceived to be open and ready for World Cup 2006, it eventually opened on 17 October 2007, and deliveries commenced on 23 October 2007. The first customer to take European delivery of a new BMW at the Welt was Jonathan Spira. There were 2,200,000 visitors during the first 12 months of operation. The number of visitors increased to 2,930,000 in 2013, of which 60% came from Germany.

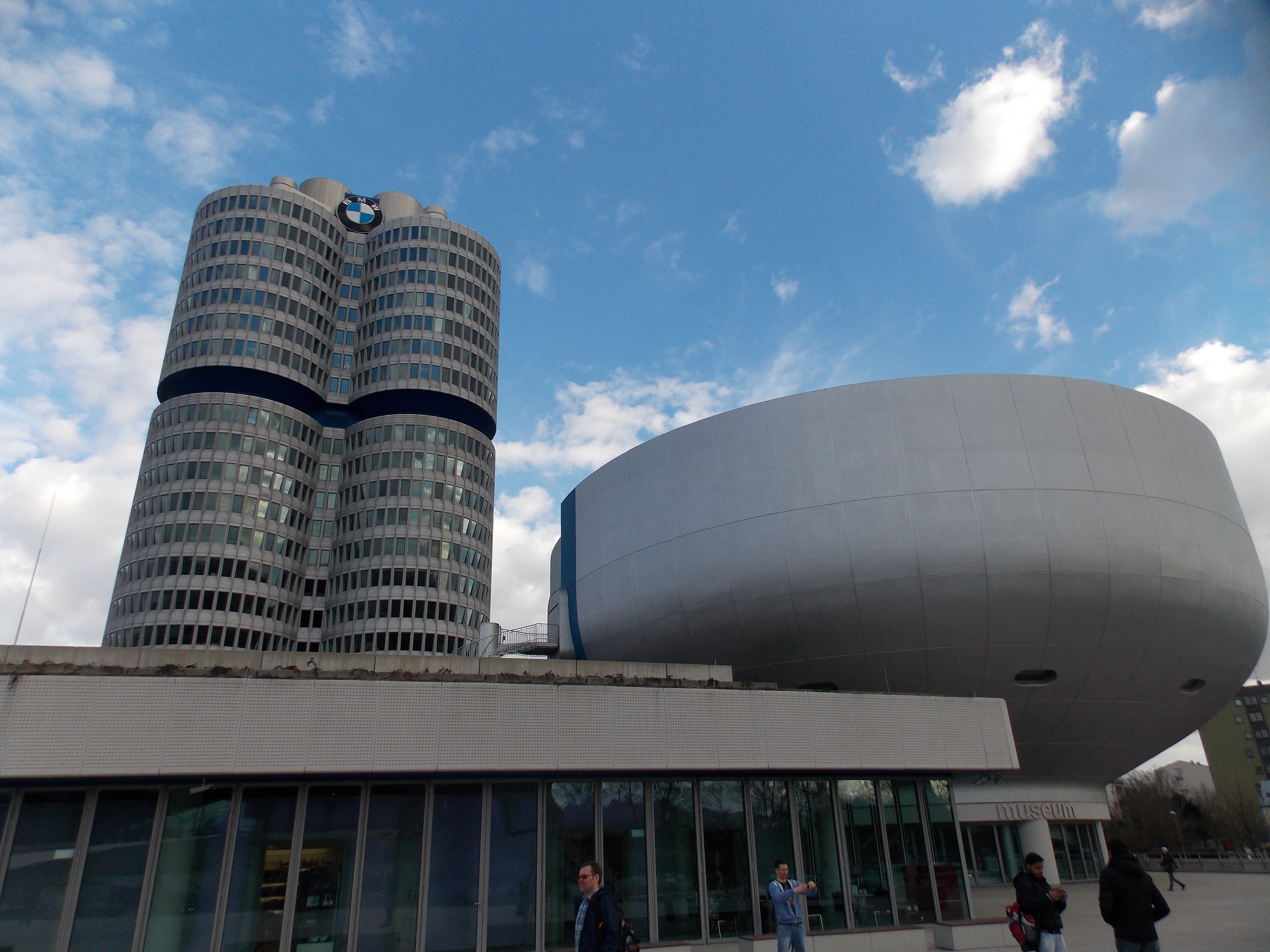
BMW Welt and BMW Headquarters, Munich, Germany

Designed with an 800 kW solar plant on its roof, "the building does not have the boredom of an exhibition hall, it is not only a temple but also a market place and communication center, and a meeting point for knowledge transfer", said architect Wolf D. Prix at the opening ceremony.

COOP HIMMELB(L)AU's BMW Welt project records are archived at the Canadian Centre for Architecture in Montreal, Quebec, Canada.

== Gallery ==
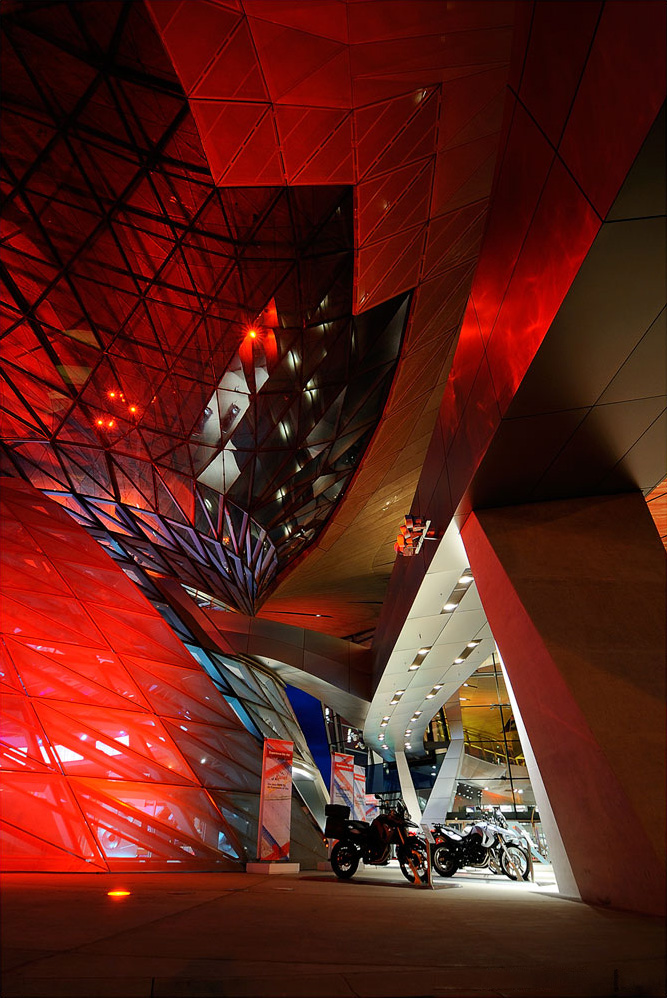
BMW Welt, 2009

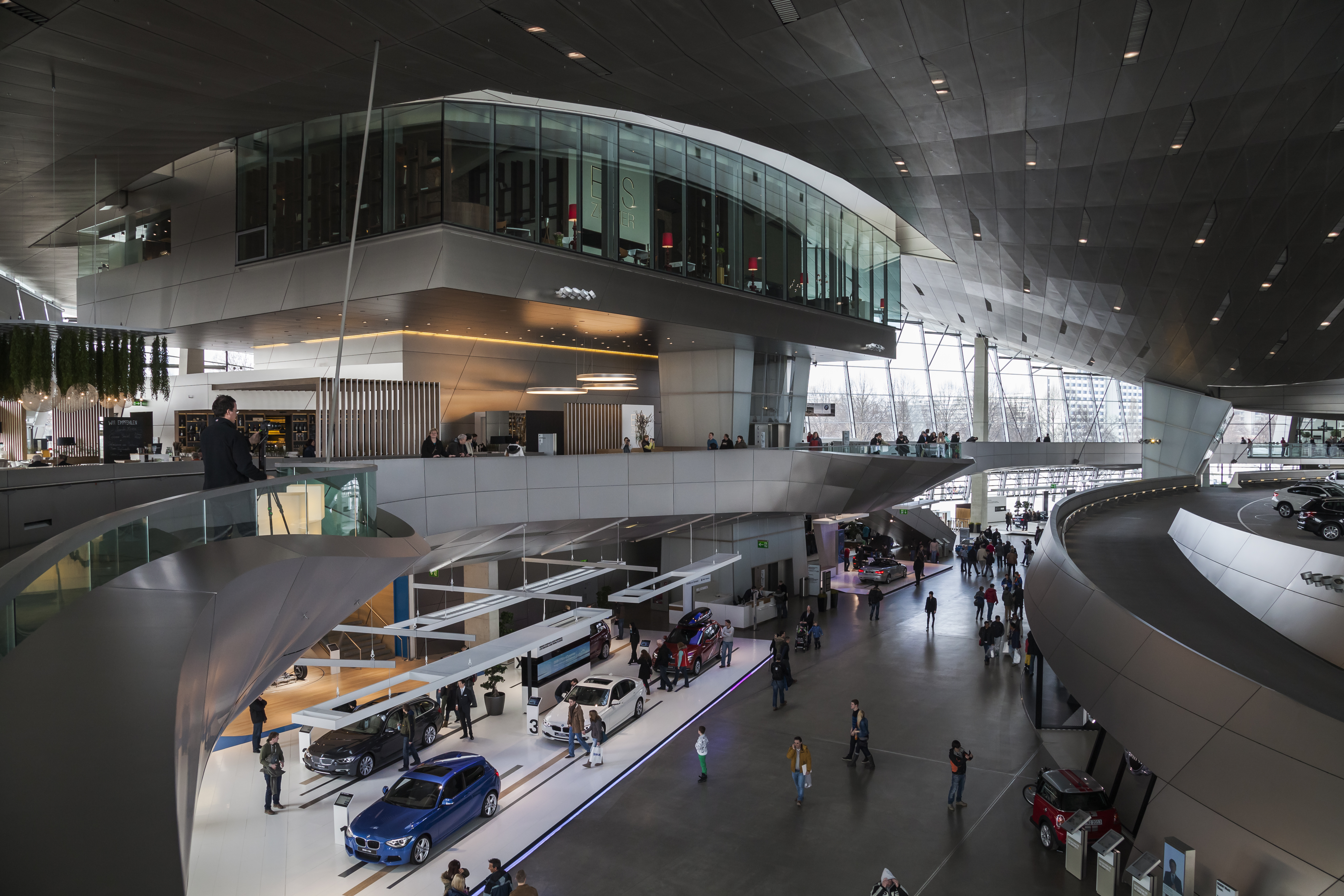
BMW Welt interior, 2013

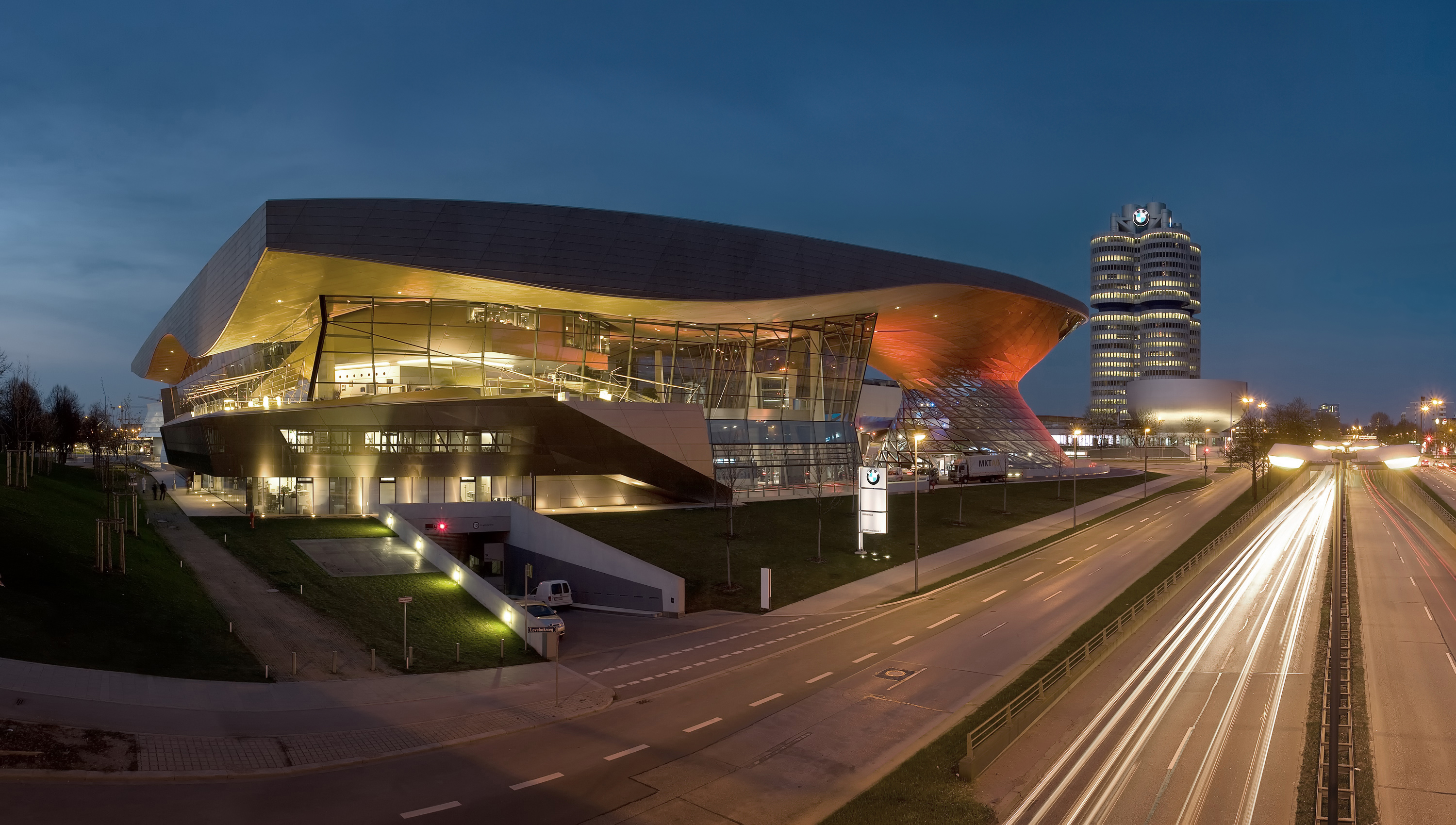
The BMW Welt exhibition center as seen at night

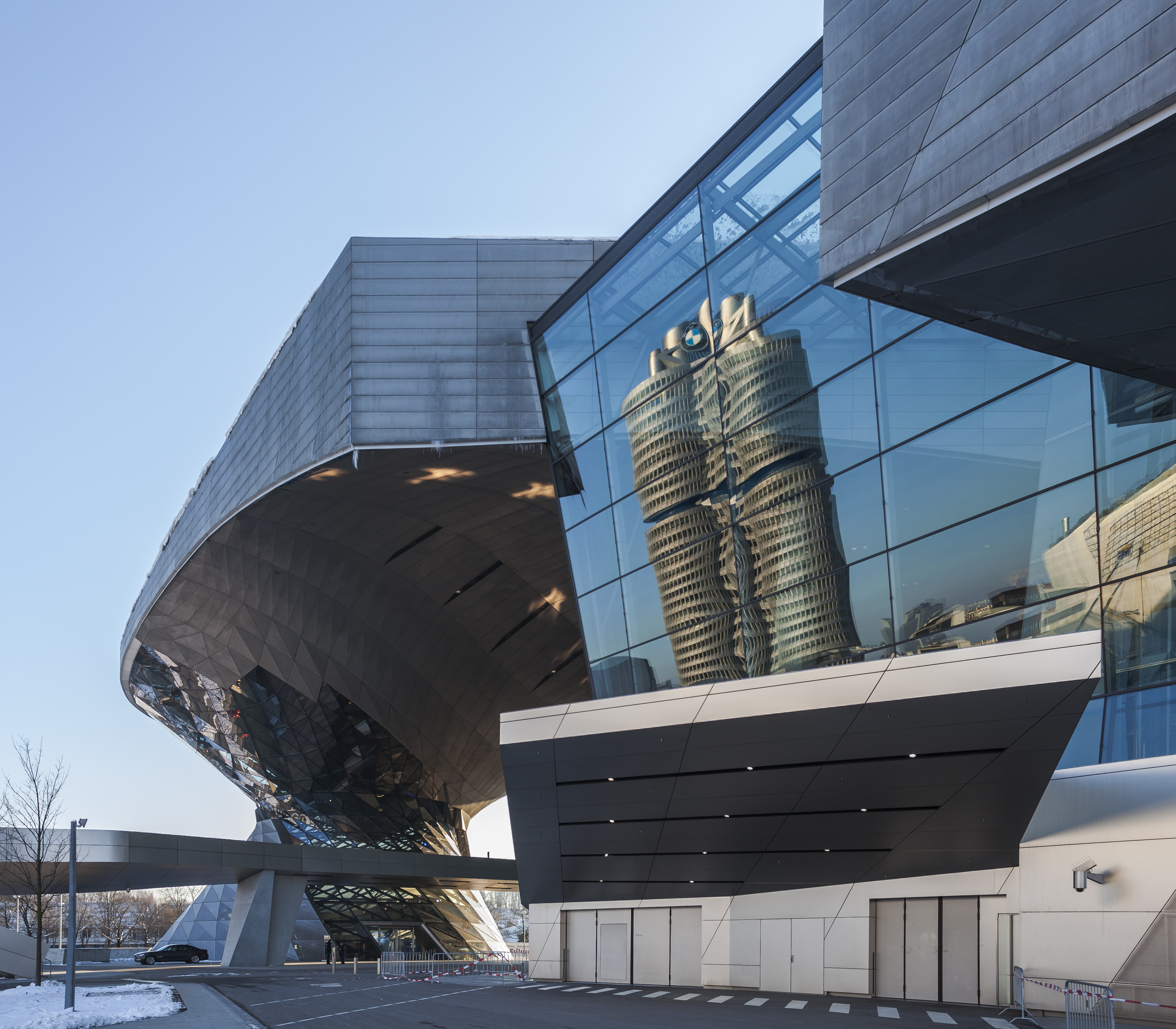
Side view

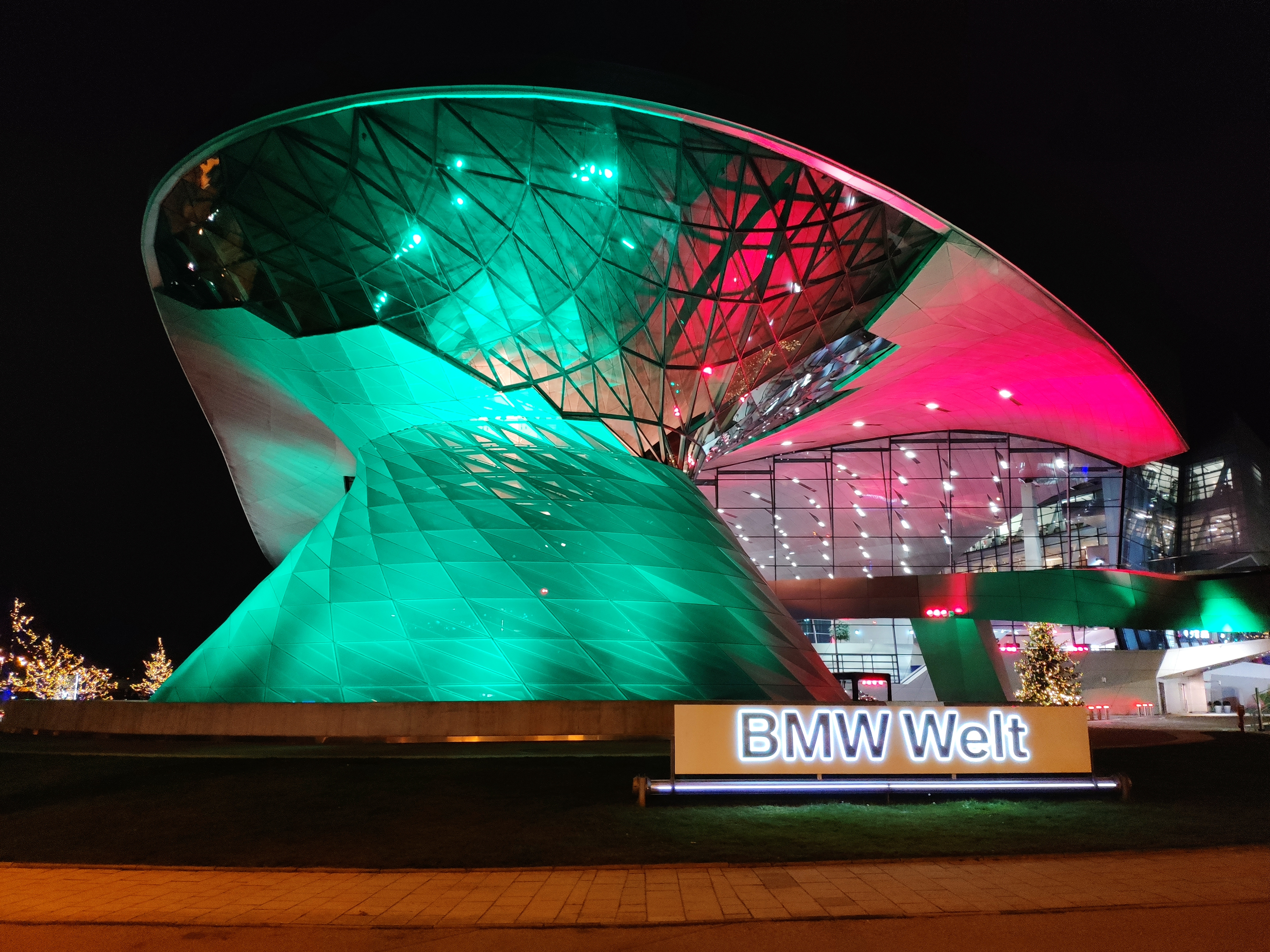
BMW Welt at night

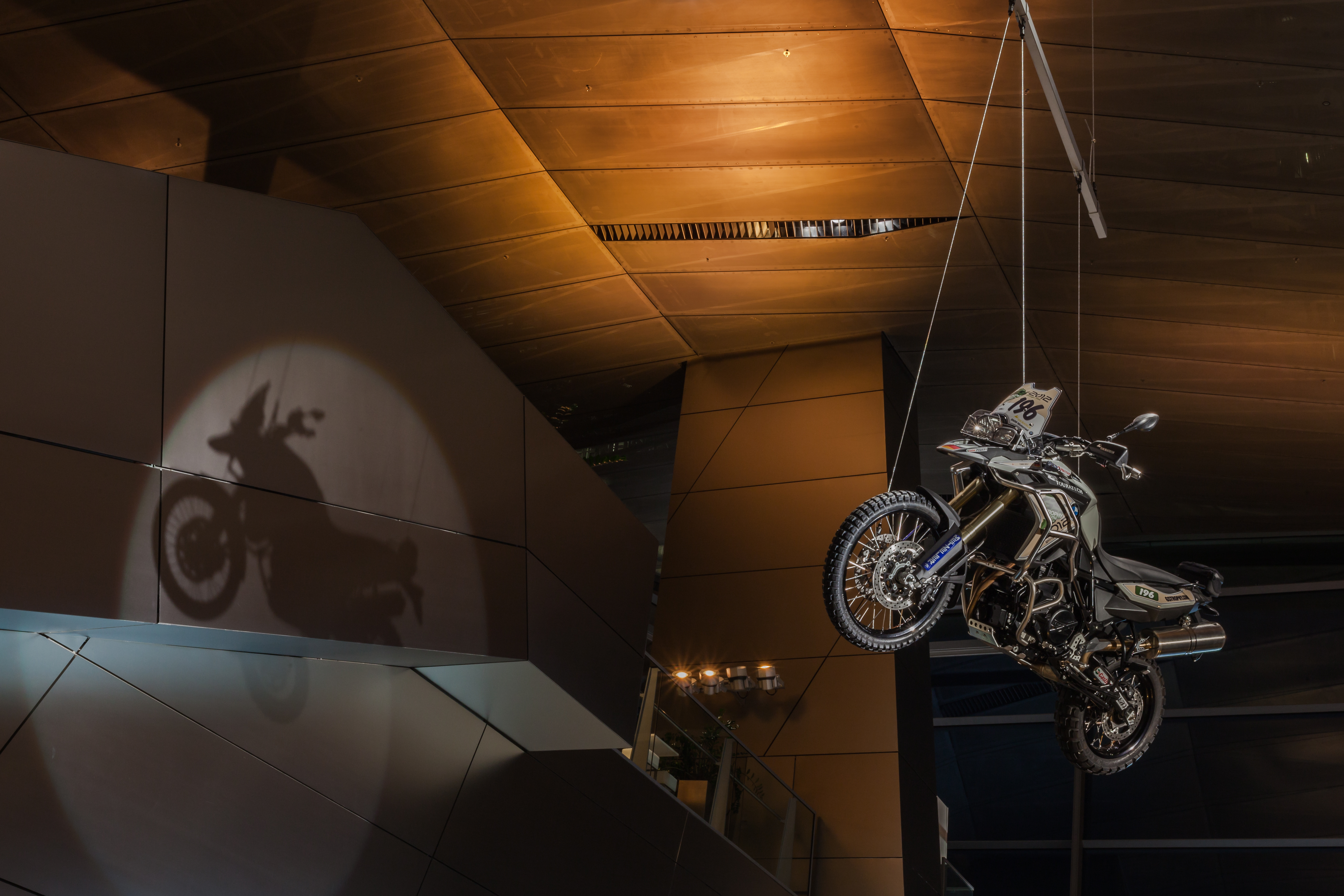
Touratech BMW F800GS inside the BMW Welt

== See also ==
- World Architecture Survey
