= Alter St.-Georgs-Platz =

Square in Munich, Germany

Coordinates: 48.1873°N 11.5627°E

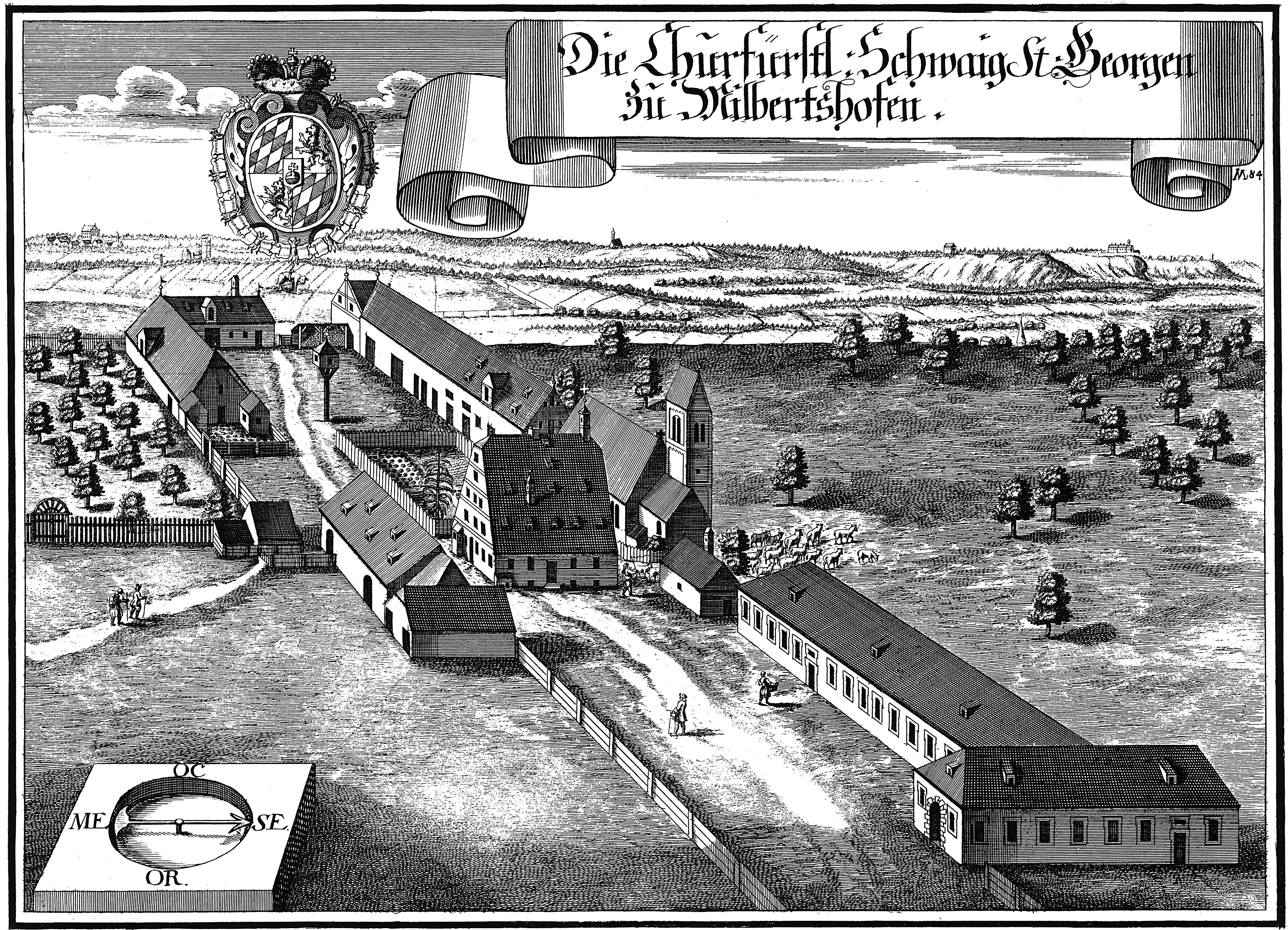
Milbertshofen 1701

Alter St.-Georgs-Platz is a square in Munich's Milbertshofen-Am Hart district.

It is located between Moosacher Straße and Motorstraße and is the historical centre of Milbertshofen. In 1913 it was named after the old parish church of St. George (D-1-62-000-224) which was built in 1510 at no. 6 of this square. On the square there are two further historical residential buildings (no. 4: two-storey free-standing saddle-roofed building, probably first half of the 19th century (D-1-62-000-222) and no. 5: two-storey free-standing saddle-roofed building, around 1850 (D-1-62-000-223)).

The building at no. 4 Alten St.-Georgs-Platz used to be an inn; finally, until July 2018 it was the district centre Milbertshofen of the non-profit association Stadtteilarbeit. Renovation work was carried out at the end of 2018. However, the municipal department rejected plans to set up a district museum on the grounds that the cost of the extensive restoration required was too high.

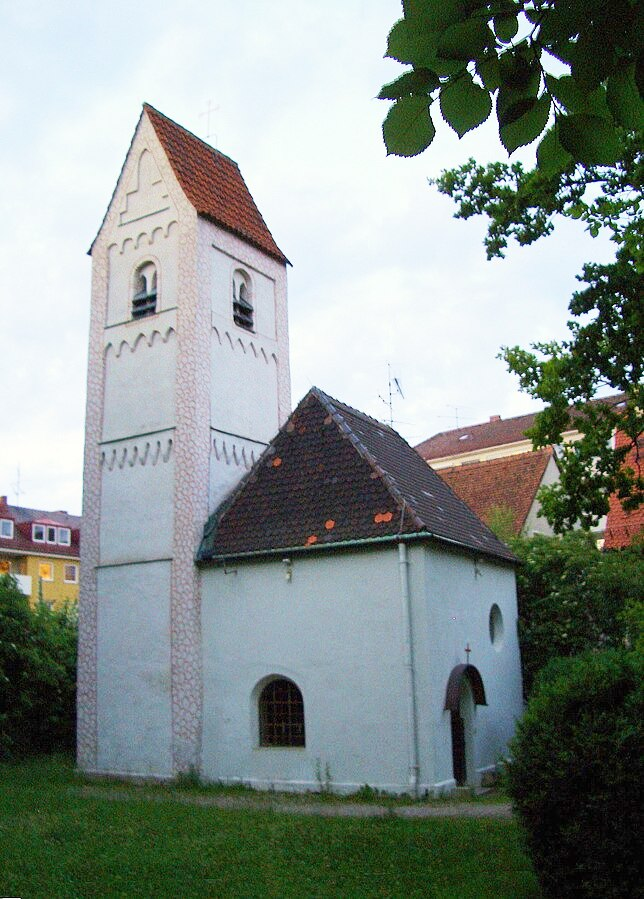
Alte St. Georgs Church

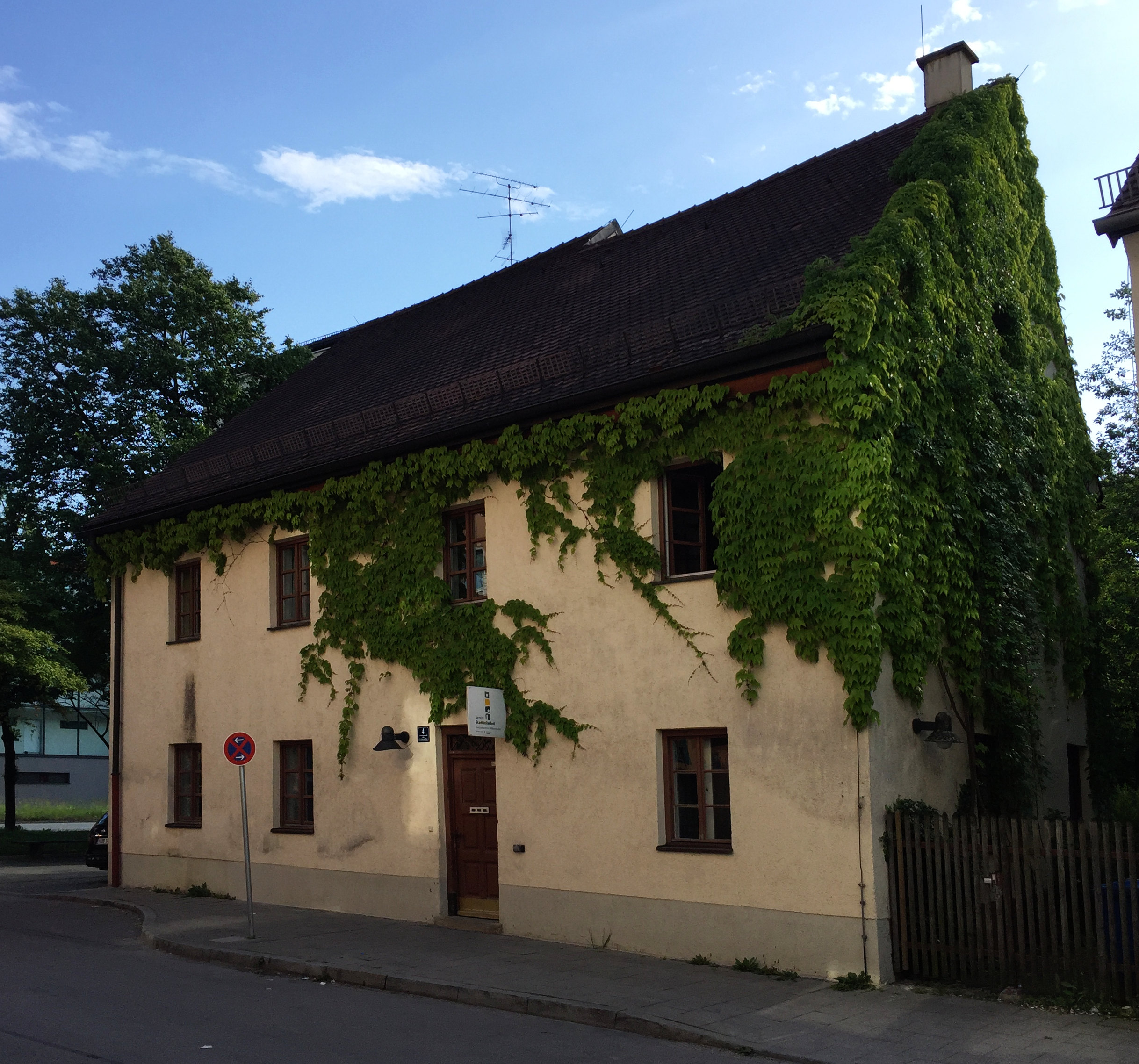
No. 4: two-storey freestanding saddle roof, probably first half of the 19th century

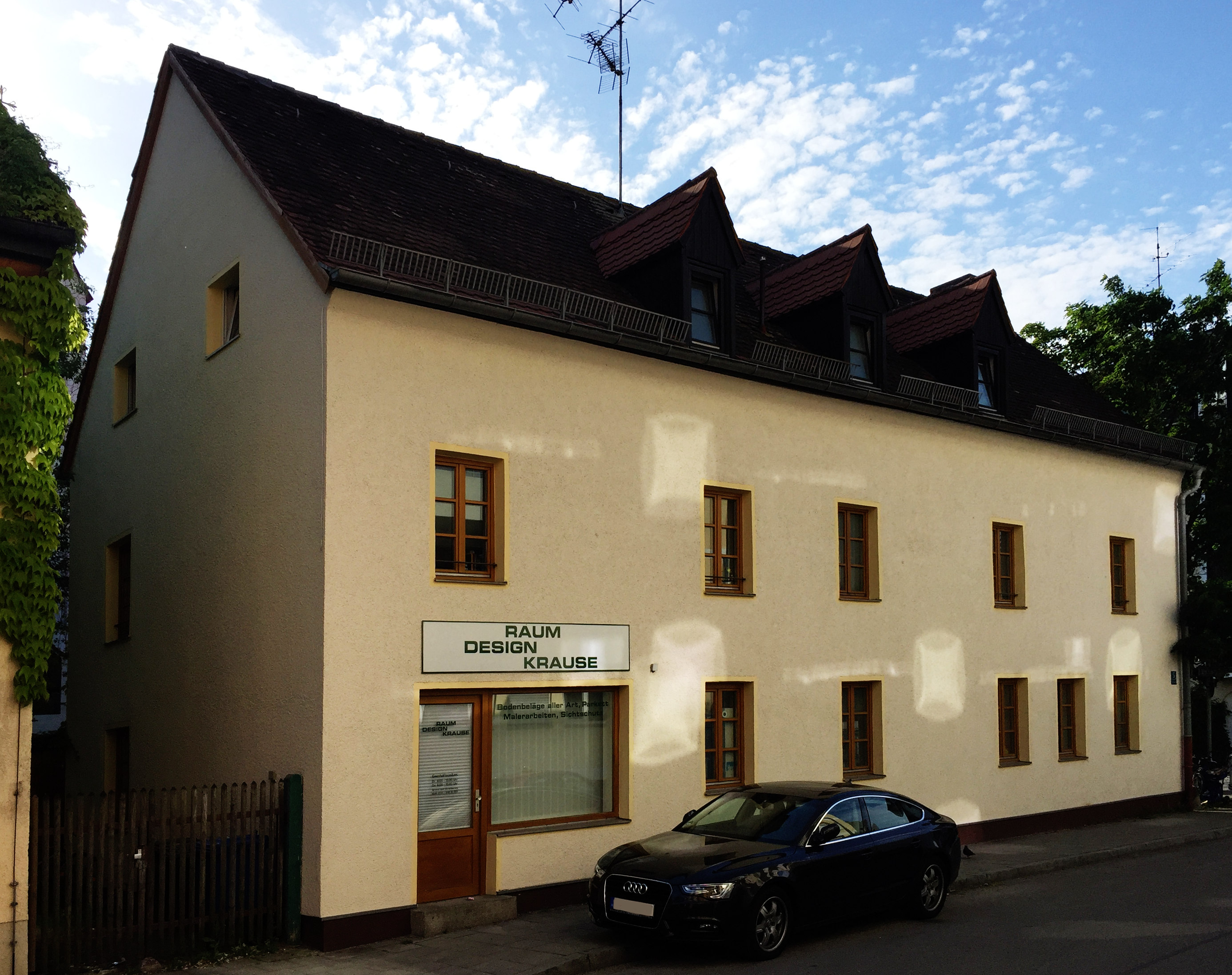
No. 5: two-storey freestanding saddle roof construction, approx. 1850
