= BMW Headquarters =

Headquarters of BMW

- BMW-Vierzylinder
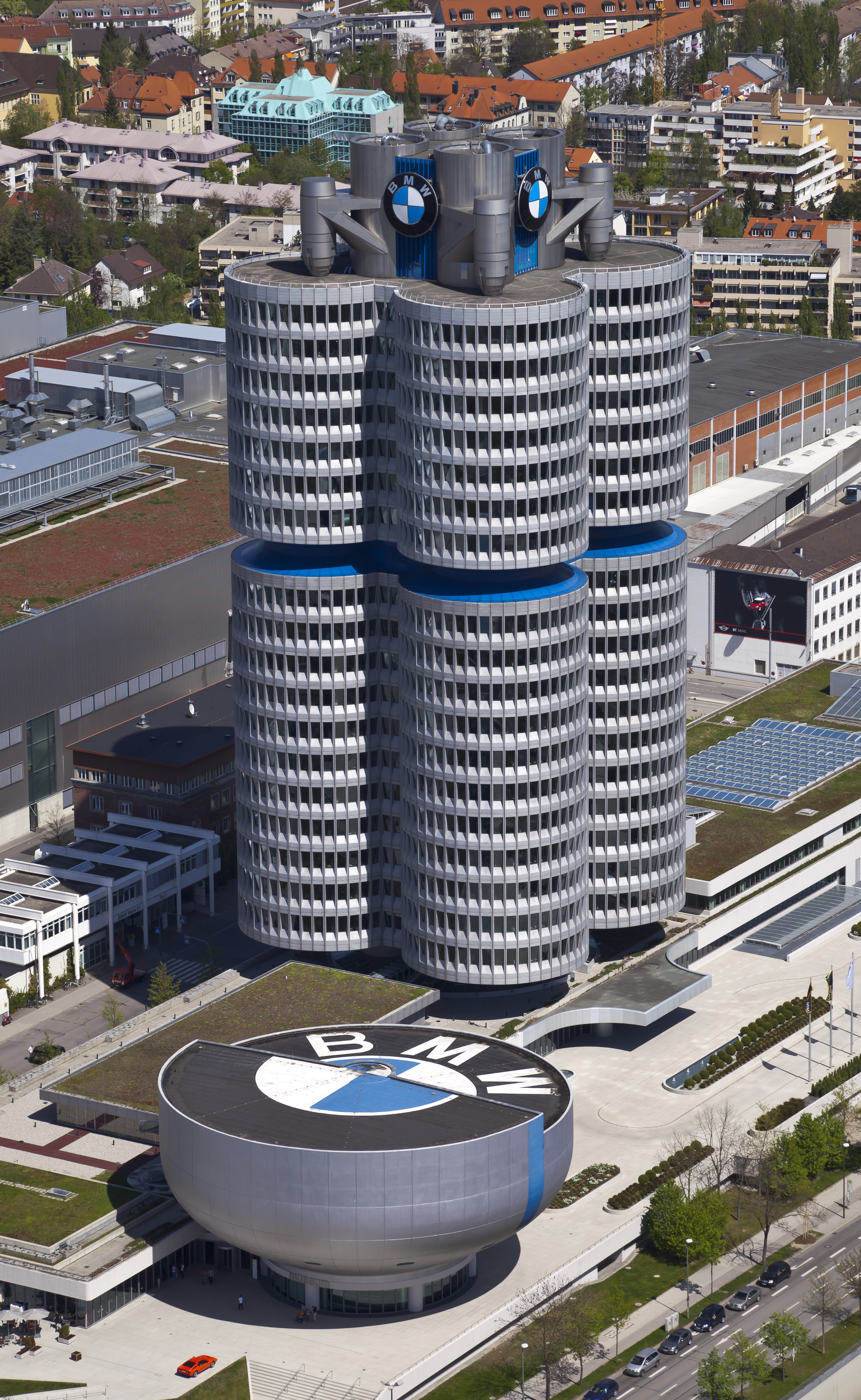
- Interactive map of the BMW Headquarters area
- Alternative names: BMW Tower (BMW-Turm)

General information
- Location: Petuelring 130; Munich, Germany
- Coordinates: 48°10′37″N 11°33′36″E
- Construction started: 1968
- Completed: 1972
- Opened: 1973

Height
- Roof: 101 m (331 ft)

Technical details
- Floor count: 22
- Floor area: 72,000 m^{2} (780,000 sq ft)

Design and construction
- Architect: Karl Schwanzer

The BMW Headquarters (German: BMW-Vierzylinder, lit. 'BMW four-cylinder'), also known as the BMW Tower (German: BMW-Turm or BMW-Hochhaus), is a high-rise building located in the Am Riesenfeld area of Munich, Germany. The building has served as the global corporate headquarters of German automaker BMW since 1973. It was declared a protected historic building in 1999, and it is often cited as one of the most notable examples of modern architecture in Munich. Extensive renovations commenced in 2004 and were completed in 2006.

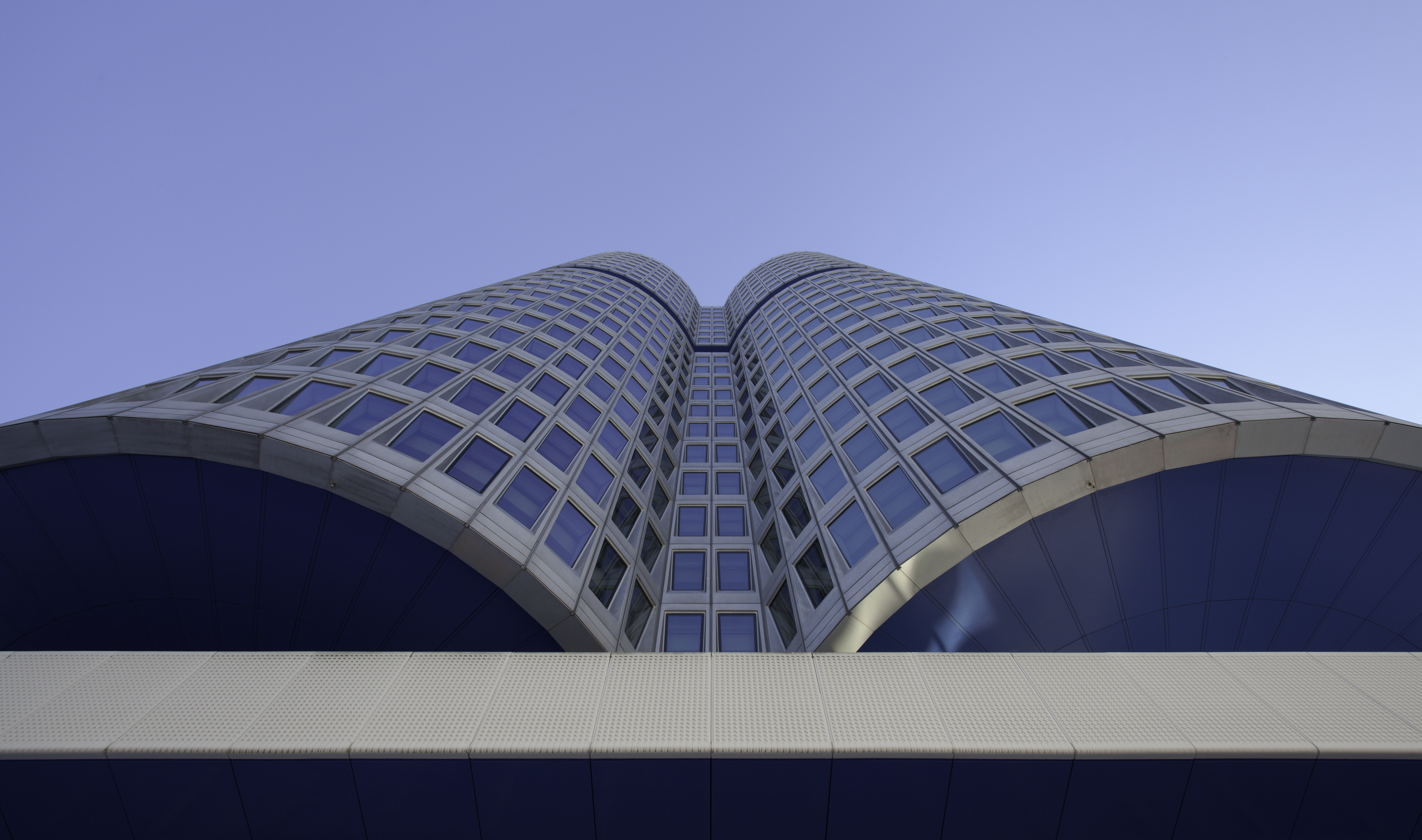
View showing façade and cladding details

== Concept and construction ==
The tower was built between 1968 and 1972, and it was ready in time for the 1972 Summer Olympics. The inauguration followed on 18 May 1973. The 101-metre (331 ft) building is located next to the Olympiapark and BMW's main factory. The tower's exterior is supposed to mimic the shape of four cylinders in a car engine, with the Museum building representing a cylinder head. Both buildings were designed by the Austrian architect Karl Schwanzer.

The tower consists of four vertical cylinders standing next to and across from each other. Each cylinder is divided horizontally in its center by a mold in the facade. Notably, these cylinders do not stand on the ground; they are suspended on a central support tower. During construction, individual floors were assembled on the ground and then elevated. The tower has a diameter of 52.30 metres (171.6 ft) and has 22 occupied floors, two of which are basements and 18 of which serve as office space.

== BMW campus ==
The BMW Museum is located right next to the tower while BMW Welt, which showcases the current cars of BMW and acts as a distribution centre, opened on the opposite side of the road on 17 October 2007.

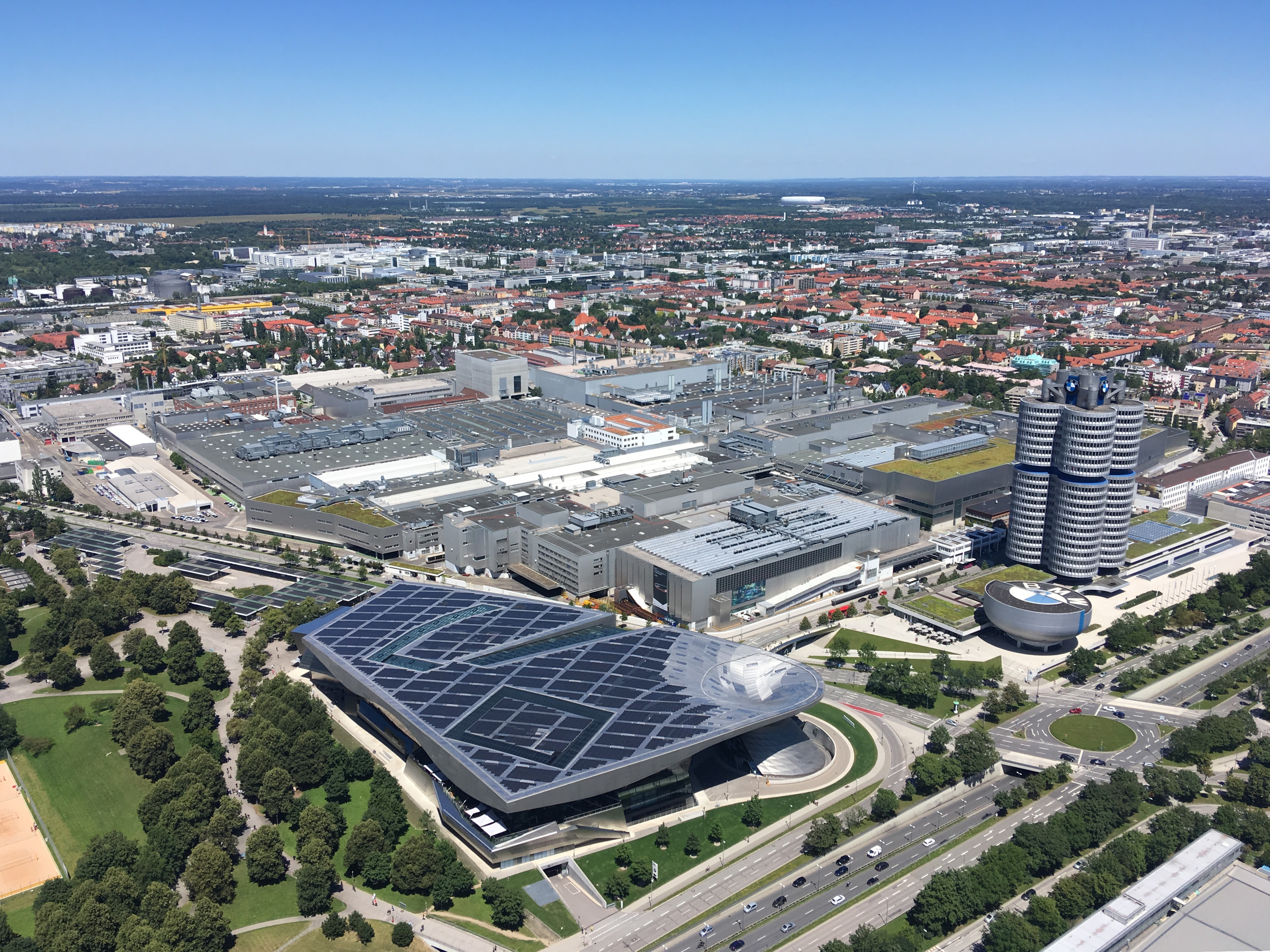
Aerial photograph of the BMW campus

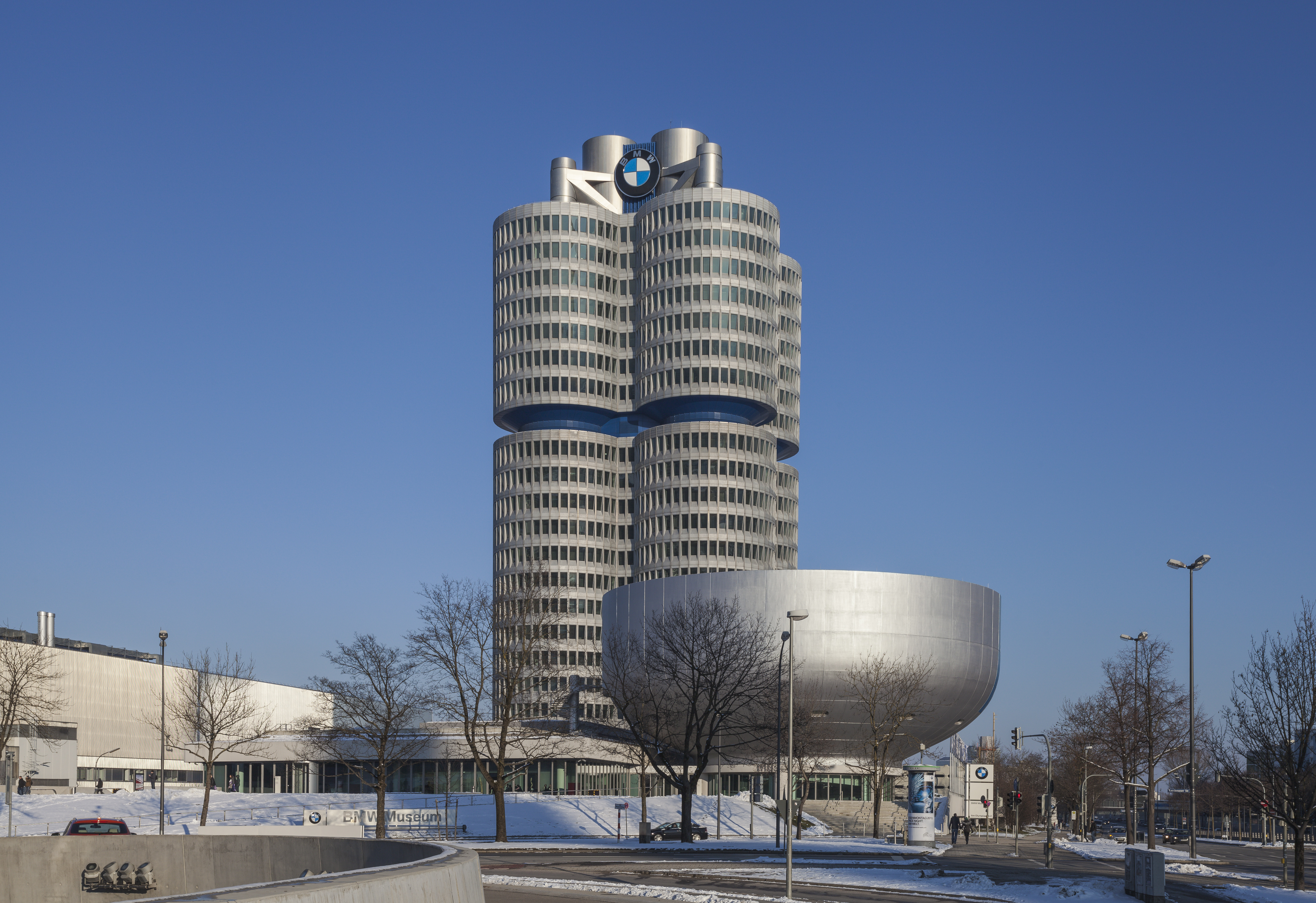
Full elevation of the tower and BMW Museum

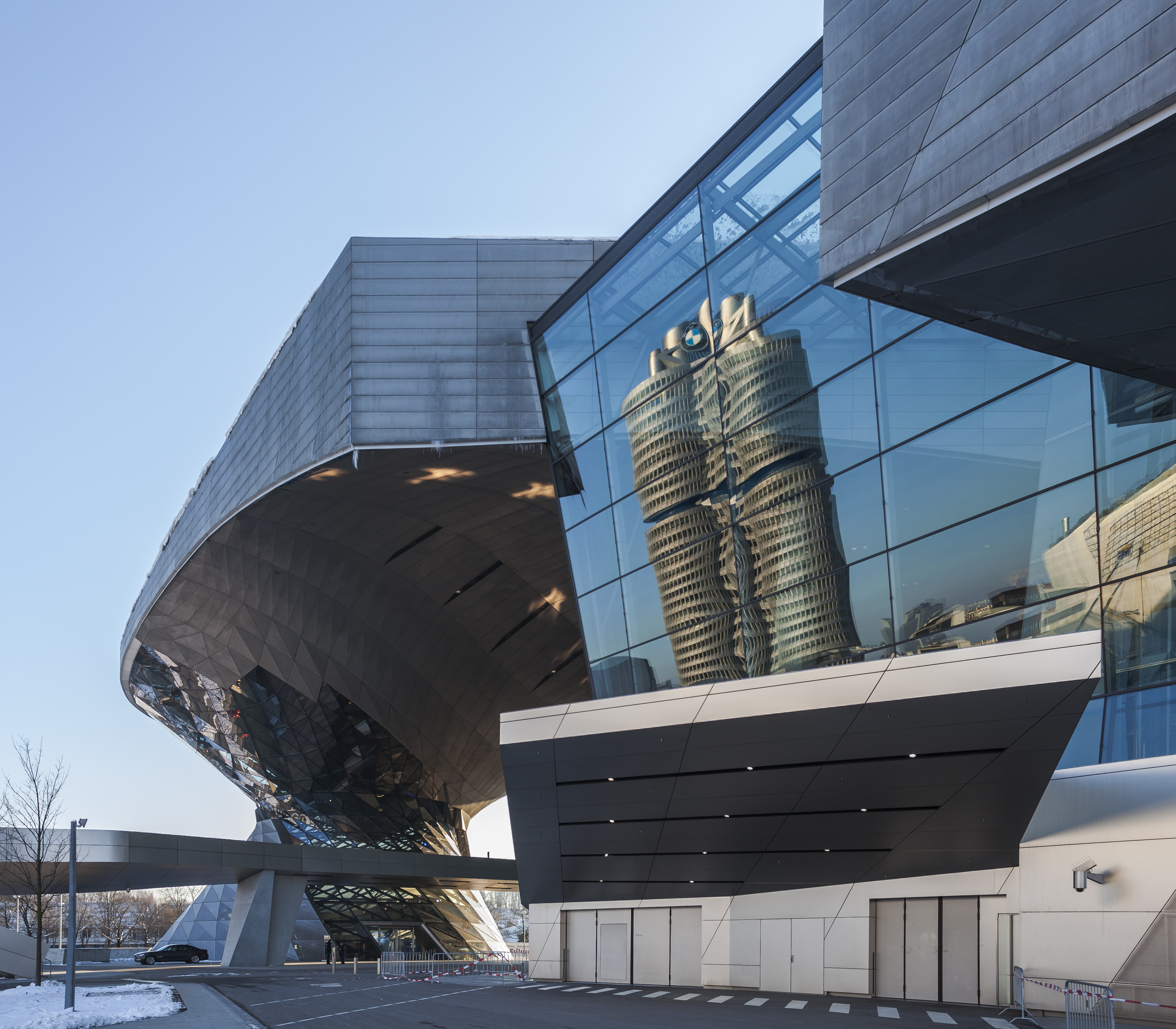
BMW Welt

== Popular culture ==
During the 1972 Summer Olympics, BMW branding was removed from the buildings to prevent product placement. BMW badging was also removed from the 2002 sedans, which accompanied Olympic marathon runners during the competition. The branding was removed again for the building's cameo appearance in the 1975 film Rollerball, replaced by large orange circles, meant to stand for the fictional ruling Energy Corporation of the future.

The building also made an appearance in the 1977 horror film Suspiria.

== See also ==
- BMW Central Building
- BMW Group Classic
- History of BMW
