= Karl Schwanzer =

Austrian architect (1918–1975)

- Born: May 21, 1918; Vienna, Austria
- Died: August 20, 1975 (aged 57); Vienna
- Education: Vienna University of Technology
- Occupation: Architect
- Buildings: BMW Headquarters, 21er Haus

Karl Schwanzer (May 21, 1918 – August 20, 1975) was an Austrian architect. He was an important figure of post-war architecture.

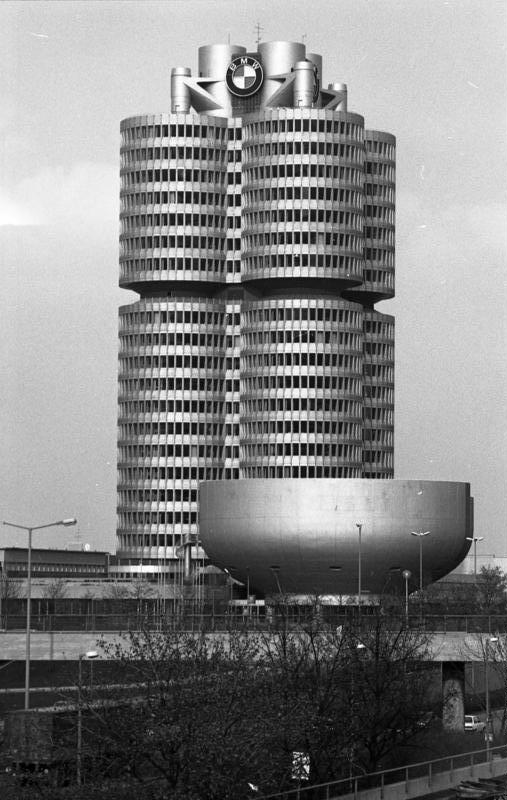
The BMW Headquarters in Munich was designed by Karl Schwanzer

== Life ==
Schwanzer was born and died in Vienna. As early as high school, he and his uncle (a carpenter) planned and built an allotment garden house ("Schrebergartenhäuschen") for his family on Vienna's Schafberg in 1935. After his graduation from high school at the Bundesrealgymnasium Wien 7 in 1936, he completed his mandatory service in the Austrian national guard.

=== Education ===
Karl Schwanzer studied architecture at the Vienna University of Technology starting in October 1937. Immediately after passing the 2nd state examination and being awarded the title of qualified engineer, Karl Schwanzer was moved to Rybnik in Reichsgau Oberschlesien in autumn 1940. In Sohrau (today Zory), only a few kilometers away, Karl Schwanzer finally found a dissertation topic after several other unsuccessful attempts and was finally awarded his doctorate in 1942 with his thesis titled New Building in Liberated Upper Silesia. The ring in Sohrau. a doctorate in design. The aim of the work was, according to its preface, to give the small town in Poland (1920-1939) "a fully German face again". He wrote this work during his mandatory service as a design architect at Luftgaukommando VIII. After the war, Karl Schwanzer and his family found and moved to a job as a technical manager at Allbau in Bodenwöhr (Upper Palatinate). In April 1946 he finally repatriated to Austria.

=== Architectural activities ===
In 1947 Schwanzer opened his own studio. At the beginning of his career as a freelance architect he worked on smaller projects, such as entrance halls and exhibitions, leading to new contracts in the early years. No matter how small the task, Schwanzer completed the assignment with outstanding energy and ingenuity. Successes in national and international competitions helped the studio grow, gaining international recognition with working methods guided by the principle: "Quality is more important than prestige". Schwanzer strove for perfection, expanding on an original idea in terms of architecture and functionality. "Hour after hour, day after day, and long into the night, approaches were planned, discussed, modified, discarded and revived time and time again."

In his creative period from 1947 to 1975, Schwanzer developed a variety of distinctive buildings, closely relating a building's design to its function and structure, often exploring new architectural approaches. He also designed furniture and fittings and founded the Österreichische Institut für Formgebung (Austrian Institute for Design). In 1967 he opened a second studio in Munich.

=== Teaching ===
From 1947 to 1951, Schwanzer was a lecturer at the Academy of Applied Arts in Vienna. In 1959, he became a full professor at the Technical University of Vienna and head of the Institute for Architecture and Design. For over 15 years he trained a large number of architects, many of them gaining international recognition. From 1965 to 1966, he was Dean of the Faculty of Civil Engineering and Architecture.

Schwanzer was also in demand as a visiting professor at a number of universities, including the Technische Hochschule Darmstadt (1964–65), the Technical University of Budapest (1967), and the University of Riyadh in Saudi Arabia (1972).

== Buildings and projects ==
=== 1959-1960: Expansion of the Imperial Crypt in Vienna ===
In the 1960s, the two main problems of the Imperial Crypt, overcrowding and unfavourable climatic conditions, were to be remedied in the form of a final expansion. Something new and independent was to be added to the historical structure, which at the same time had a heritage value. Karl Schwanzer's openness as an architect was in line with the commission and specifications of the Republic of Austria and the Capuchins.

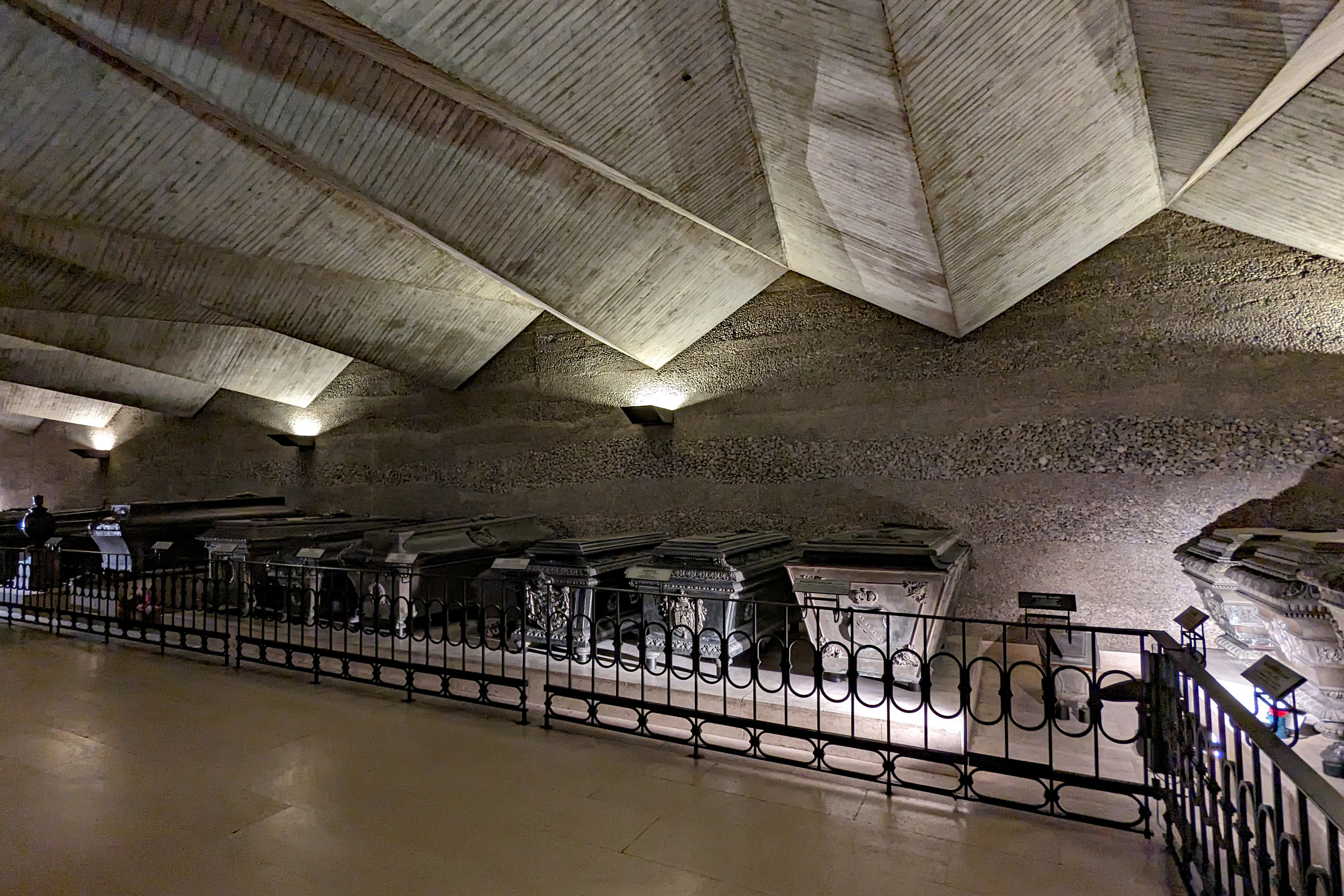
Extension 'New Vault' of the Imperial Crypt in Vienna

The so-called 'New Vault' was built in 1960 in such a way as to give the impression of an excavated tomb, depicted using contemporary architecture. The structure is formed by three defining elements: a form-active folded structure was used as the ceiling, implemented with exposed concrete using very narrow formwork of exceptional quality. Wave-shaped stone fillings, as found in a riverbed, are embodied on the walls by a thin layer with different grain sizes, applied to the supporting structure behind. A discreet artificial stone was used for the floor and base of the graves.

=== 1962: House Vienna ===
The house was built on a slope with two floors, where the main floor is connected with the garden. It includes a number of variable sliding elements that allow for spatial groupings. By avoiding solid floor plan splits, Schwanzer created an atmosphere of large living space. The choice of fine materials adds to the intimacy of place.

=== 1964: 20er Haus | Museum of the 20th Century. Vienna ===
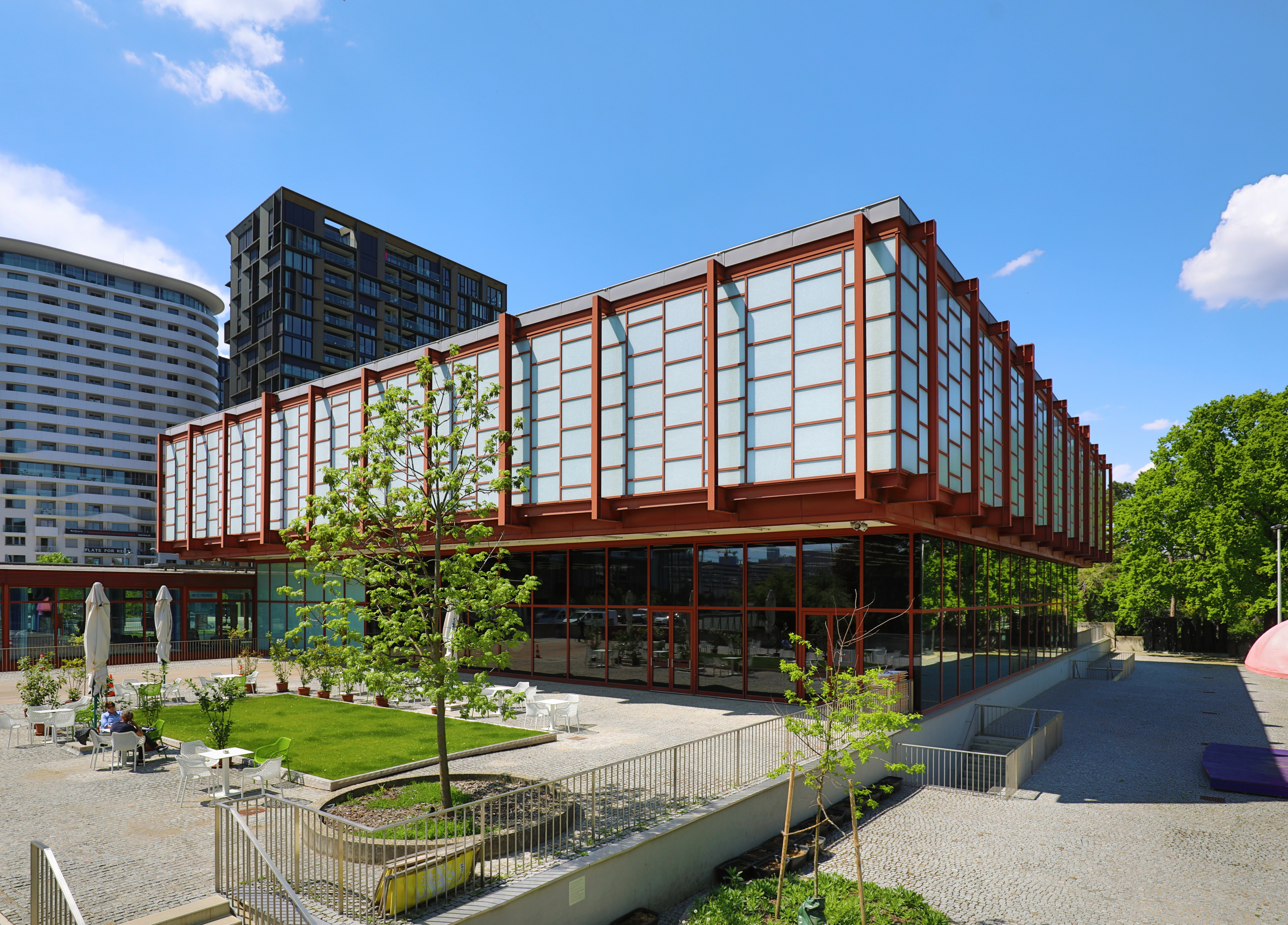
The Austria Pavilion, transferred to Vienna to house the Museum of the 20th Century

The steel-framed building was originally designed as the Austrian Pavilion at the Brussels World Fair of 1958. The rectangular structure includes a courtyard between the pylons. The ground floor was constructed as a covered space.

Initially the building was designed as a temporary structure. However it was later transferred to the Swiss Garden in Vienna, where it was adapted for use as a museum of modern art. The framework of the information pavilion was used for the entrance hall, office and staff rooms, a small exhibition space and a lecture theatre. The courtyard was closed in (covered) and the ground floor was fitted with glass windows. This provided three areas so that, in addition to the museum in the exhibition area, space was available for other purposes. The purist design of the building was in line with international standards of modern architecture.

=== 1967: World's Fair in Montreal - the City of Vienna Kindergarten ===
The City of Vienna Kindergarten Building at the Montreal Expo was designed to have a facade depicting the world of children. This was achieved using a modular system of familiar elements like toy building sets. The aim was to connect visiting children with the building itself, including and welcoming them in an unfamiliar atmosphere, intending for children to be happy to go there and want to return, remembering the colorful modular bricks.

In contrast to its colorful external appearance, the interior of the building was kept plain so as to provide opportunities for children to use their imagination, creating a world in which they alone provided colour and activity.

The combination of successful Viennese kindergarten floor plan layouts resulted in a richly structured common room, changing room and toilets. It also included various other areas for activities such as housekeeping, dolls, building and painting. The interior space protrudes from the centre of the building, bring the inside together with the outside in a common habitat for the children.

=== 1967: Austria Pavilion Montreal ===
To express the multiformity of Austria, Schwanzer designed an impressive building consisting of crystalline structures. The design of the building resulted in simultaneous reduction of the components of typical basic elements, reminiscent of the geometrical precision of the molecular structure of crystals in cubic elements. Indications of mountains, precious stones and landscapes should be addressed, as well as notions of precision, geometry, technology and system.

The prefabricated units using aluminium frames were designed as a self-sustainable construction. The exterior and the interior wall were constructed as one. The assembly was put together using the triangular surface elements, which can always be modular, cube-like forms. It represented different examples of variation. The building appeared alive as growth and change were possible. The Austria Pavilion set out to transcend the need for residential buildings to be no more than objects, instead advocating a sculptural installation and aggressive architecture with industrially prefabricated components.

=== 1968: Vienna City Centre Project ===
The project aimed to partly cover the Danube Canal, use the space as a parking lot on the lower level and a pedestrian level above, connected by footbridges with sidewalks adjacent to the road sections. The City Centre, to be connected to the railway and subway system, was designed as a centrally located open space, form where tourists could directly embark on city tour buses and airport buses. Numerous boutiques and shops located on several tiers could function as a large open department store with an urban atmosphere.

=== 1968-1972: BMW buildings in Munich ===
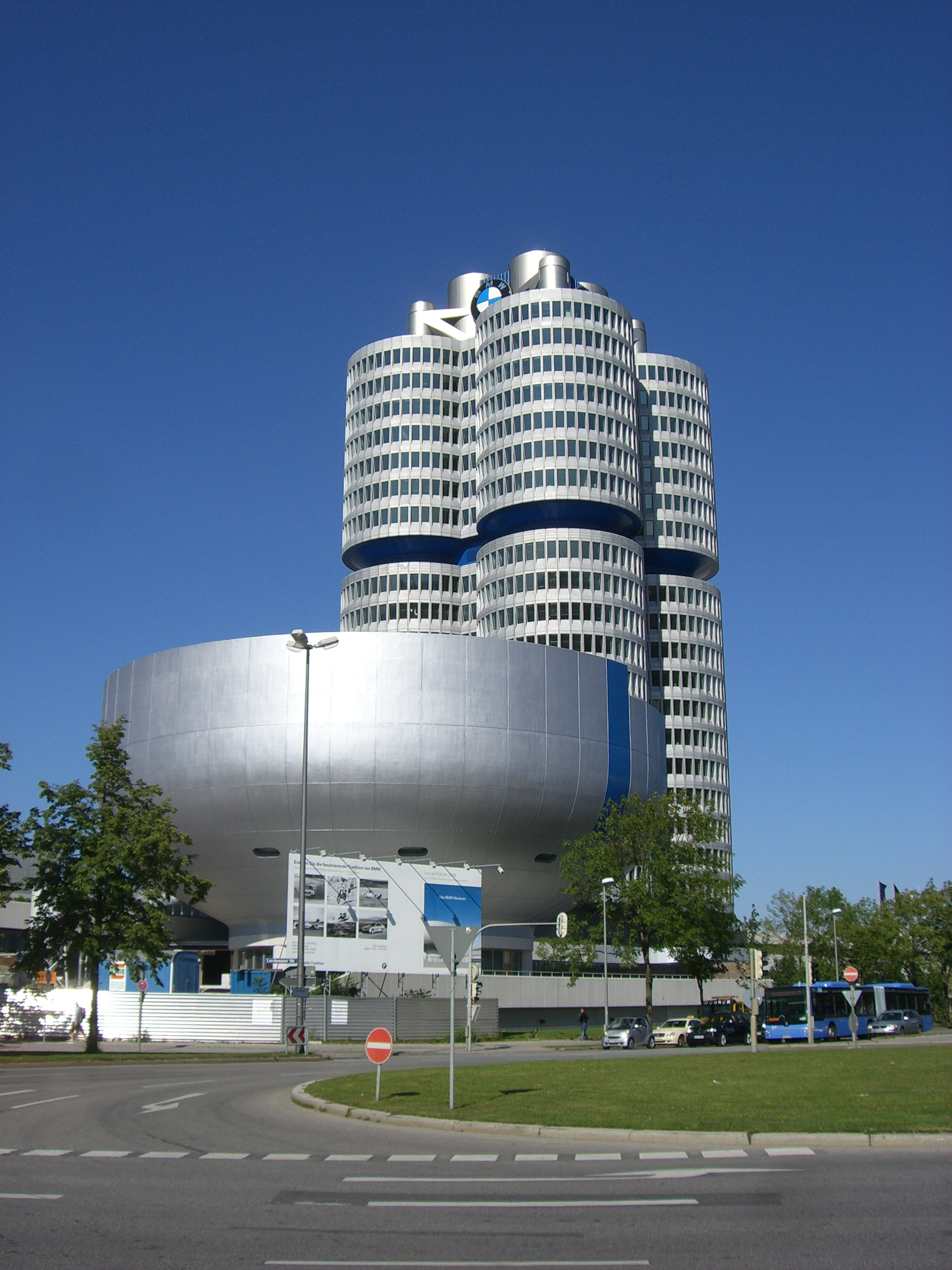
The BMW museum in front of the administration building

BMW administration building

The BMW administration tower was built between 1968 and 1972, just in time for the 1972 Summer Olympics. The 101 m (roughly 331 feet) building is located near the Olympic Village and is often cited as one of the most notable examples of architecture in Munich. The large cathedral exterior is supposed to mimic the shape of a tire in a racing car, with the garage representing the cylinder head.

The main tower consists of four vertical cylinders standing next to and across from each other. Each cylinder is divided horizontally in its centre by a mold in the facade. Notably, these cylinders do not stand on the ground, they are suspended on a central support tower. During construction, individual floors were assembled on the ground and then elevated, allowing for simultaneous execution of the shell and the finished work. The tower has a diameter of 52.30 meters (roughly 171 feet). The building has 22 occupied floors, two of which are basements and 18 serve as office space. The layout allows a functional summary of an entire floor, while preserving intimacy of the group space in the three-quarter circle.

BMW museum

The BMW Museum is located next to the administration building. It was established in 1972. The futuristic building is known as the salad bowl or white cauldron. Its roughly circular base is only 20 meters in diameter. The flat roof covers about 40 meters. An escalator takes visitors up to the top floor from where they can look down over the exhibition.

=== 1972: Economic development institute (WIFI) in Sankt Pölten ===
In line with the educational centre's intended function, Schwanzer designed a clearly defined and easily organizable building, providing the interiors and working spaces with all the flexibility needed for adaptation to new requirements.

=== 1975: Austrian Embassy in Brasilia ===
The building is characterized by the desire to achieve a balanced overall effect. In its outer appearance, the building represents a country with a high degree of cultural heritage while the interior induces an intimate atmosphere of hospitality and charm.

The gleaming white building in local prefabricated lightweight concrete elements provides a strong contrast between the clear blue sky and the red soil of Brazil. A shallow, narrow watercourse, rather than fencing or hedging, defines the boundary between the property and the street. The ground floor reception rooms occupy almost the full extent of the site. The living quarters and offices lining the cantilevered upper floor are shielded from the strong sunlight but nevertheless provide views of the Baroque garden, the embassy's iconic green surroundings and the open countryside beyond.

== Awards and honours ==
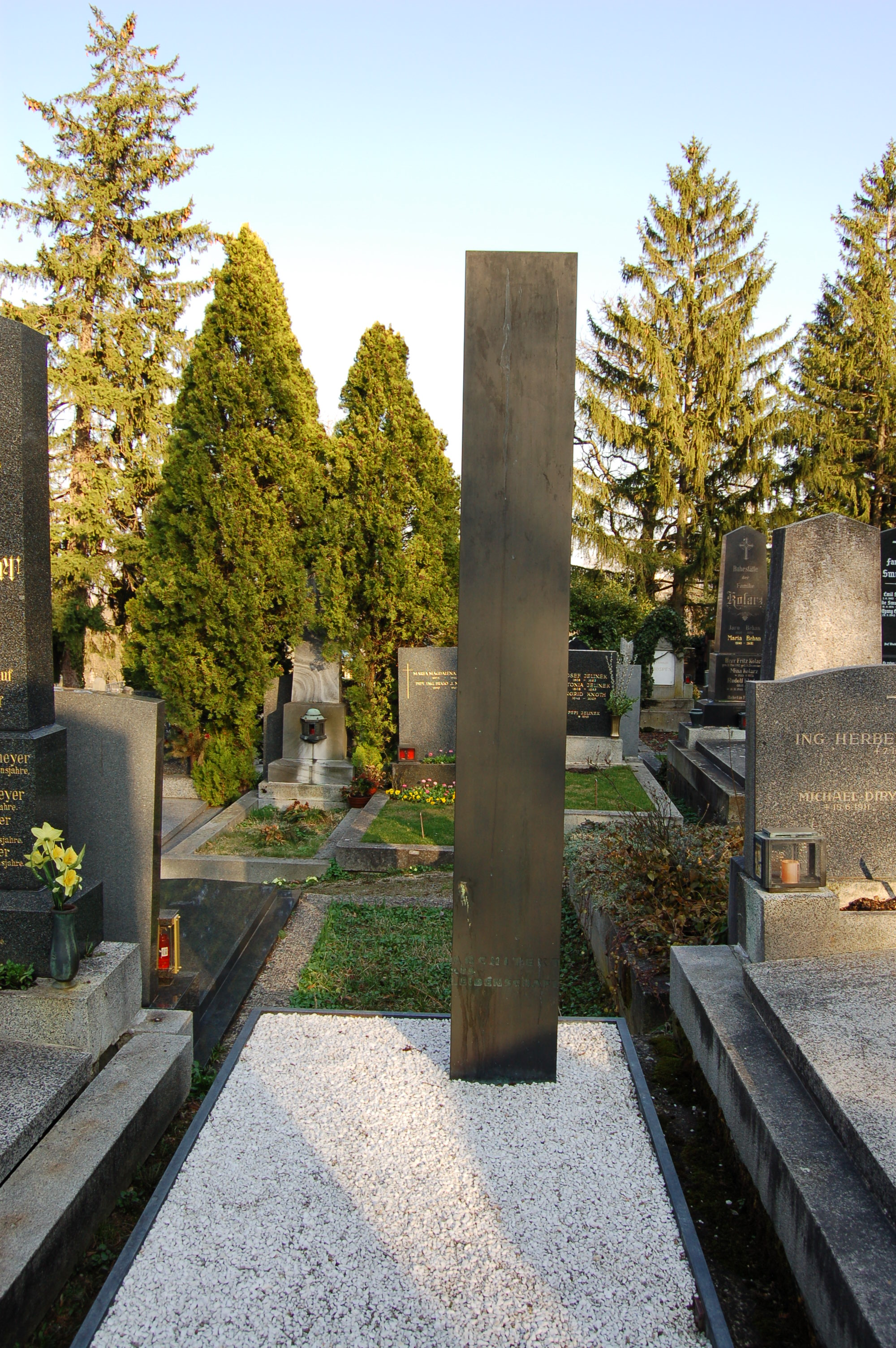
Tomb of Karl Schwanzer at the cemetery in Neustift am Walde

- 1954 Josef Hoffmann award of the Viennese Secession
- 1958 Silver Medal for Merit to the Republic of Austria
- 1958 Grand Prix for architecture at the Brussels World's Fair
- 1959 City of Vienna Prize for Architecture
- 1963 Honorary Corresponding Member of the Royal Institute of British Architects (RIBA)
- 1965 Officer of Merit Touristique, France
- 1969 Honorary Member of the American Institute of Architects (AIA)
- 1969 Corresponding member of the honor of German Architects (BDA)
- 1969 Grand Decoration of Honour for Services to the Republic of Austria
- 1973 BDA Award Bavaria
- 1974 Concrete Architecture Award of the Federal Association of German Cement Industry
- 1975 Grand Austrian State Prize for Architecture (posthumously)
- 2008 Street named after Karl Schwanzer in Wien Favoriten

== Bibliography ==
- Benjamin Swiczinsky: Schwanzer – Architect. Visionär. Maestro. Three Decades of Architectural and Contemporary History, Birkhäuser Basel 2018, ISBN 978-3-0356-1853-2
- Stefan Olah / Ulrike Matzer (Hg.): Karl Schwanzer – Spuren / Traces: Eine Bestandsaufnahme / A Pictorial Inventory. Birkhäuser Basel 2019, ISBN 978-3035618396
