= Anhalter Platz =

Square in Munich, Germany

Coordinates: 48.1873°N 11.5616°E

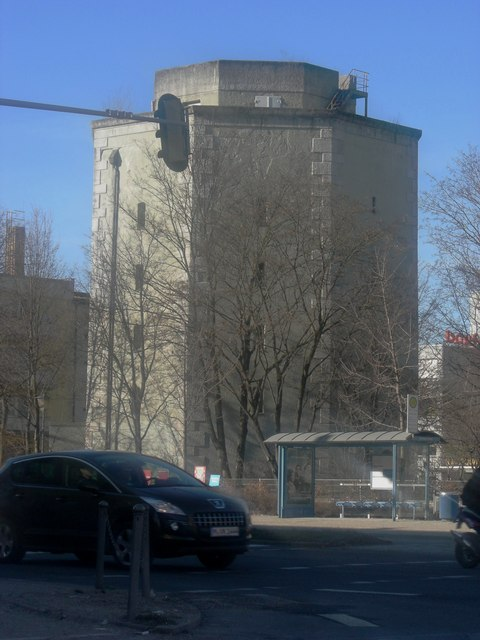
High bunker at Anhalter Platz

Anhalter Platz is a square in Munich's district 11 Milbertshofen-Am Hart in the district Am Riesenfeld.

== Description ==
It is located between Moosacher Straße, Riesenfeldstraße and Motorstraße. There is a playground next to it. At Anhalter Platz 3 lies the architectural monument Hochbunker Anhalter Platz.

It was named after the province of Anhalt, today part of the federal state of Saxony-Anhalt.

Until May 1972 the tram line 7, coming from Petuelring ended at Anhalter Platz.
