= Moosacher Straße =

Street in Munich, Germany

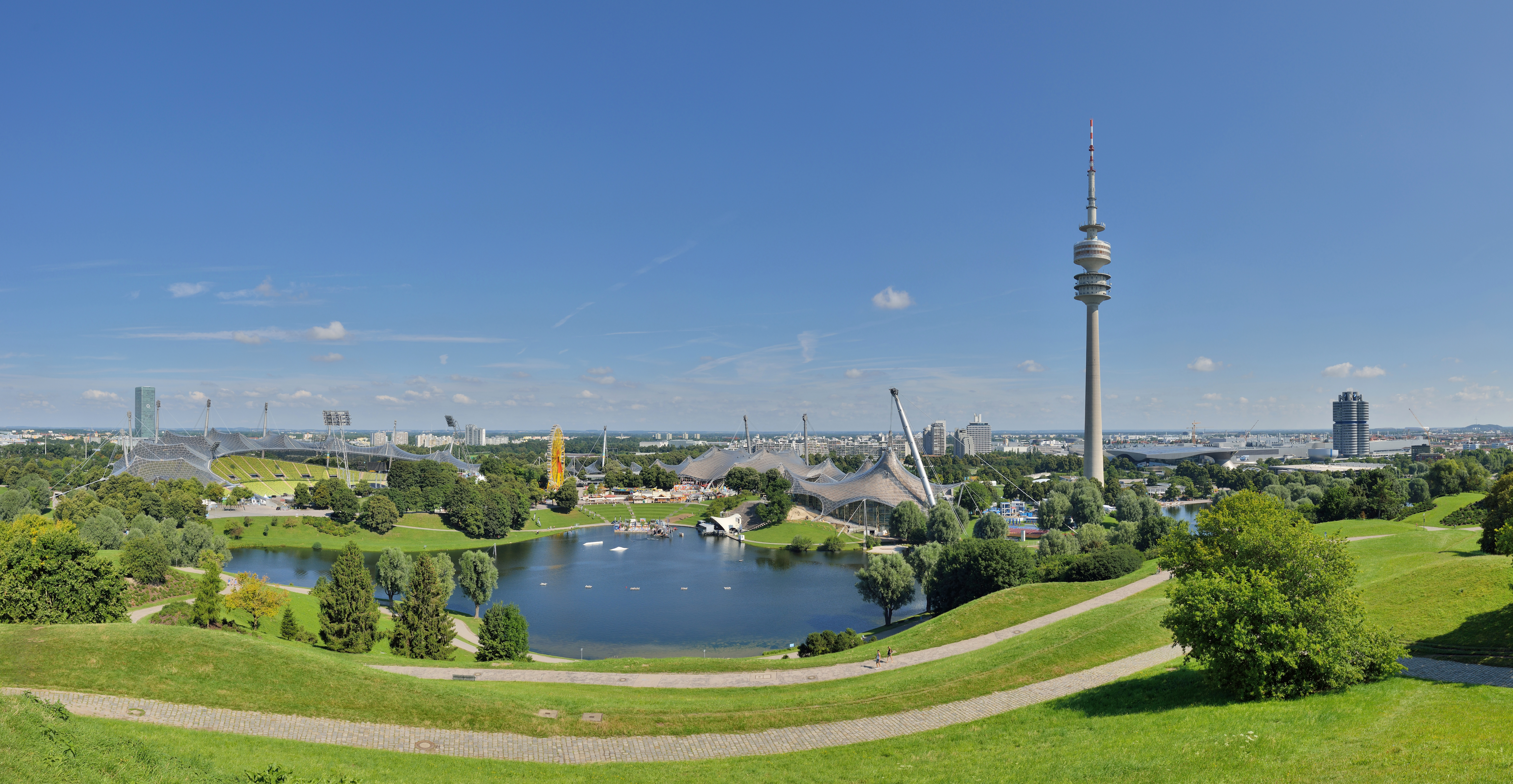
Olympiapark

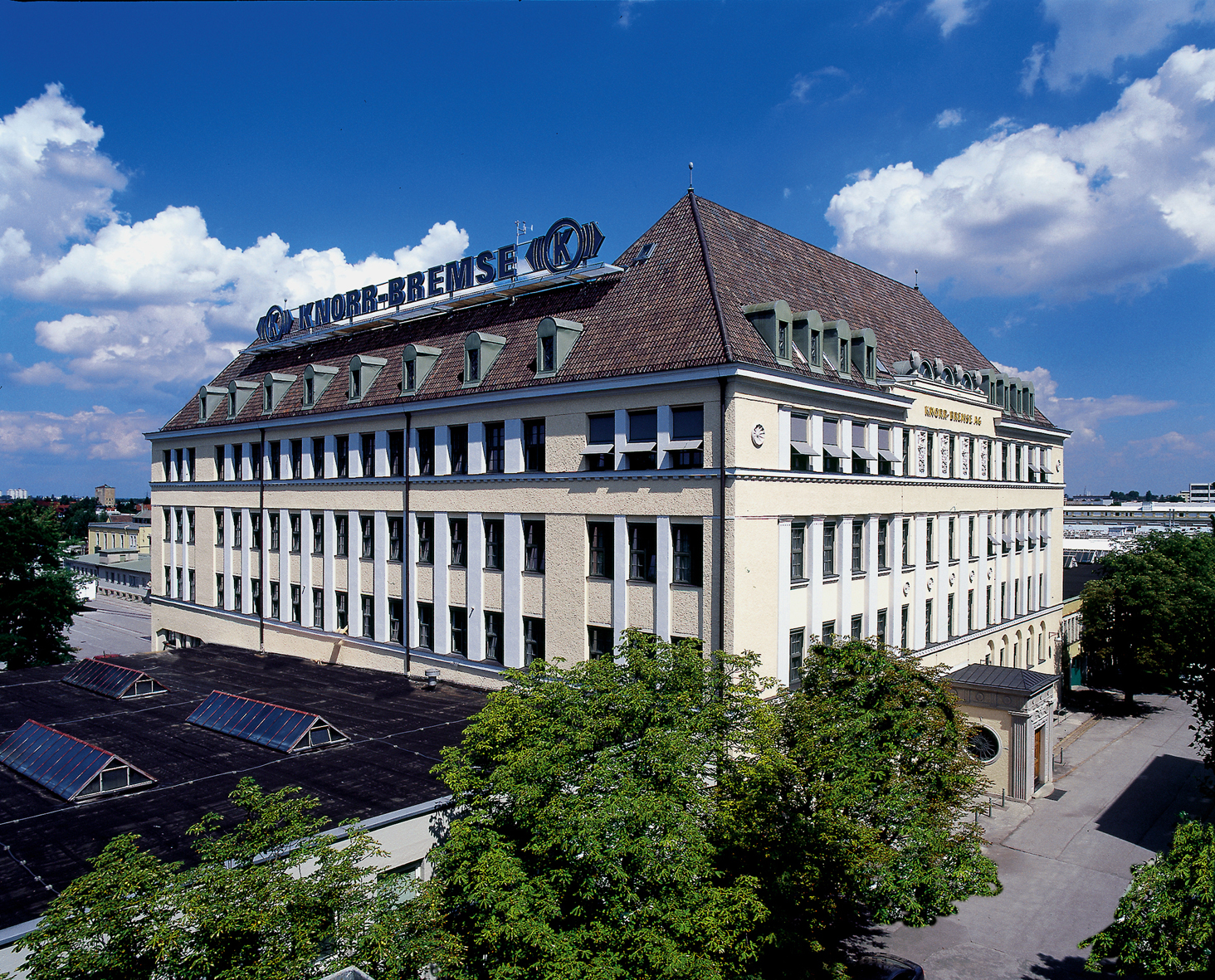
Knorr Bremse headquarter

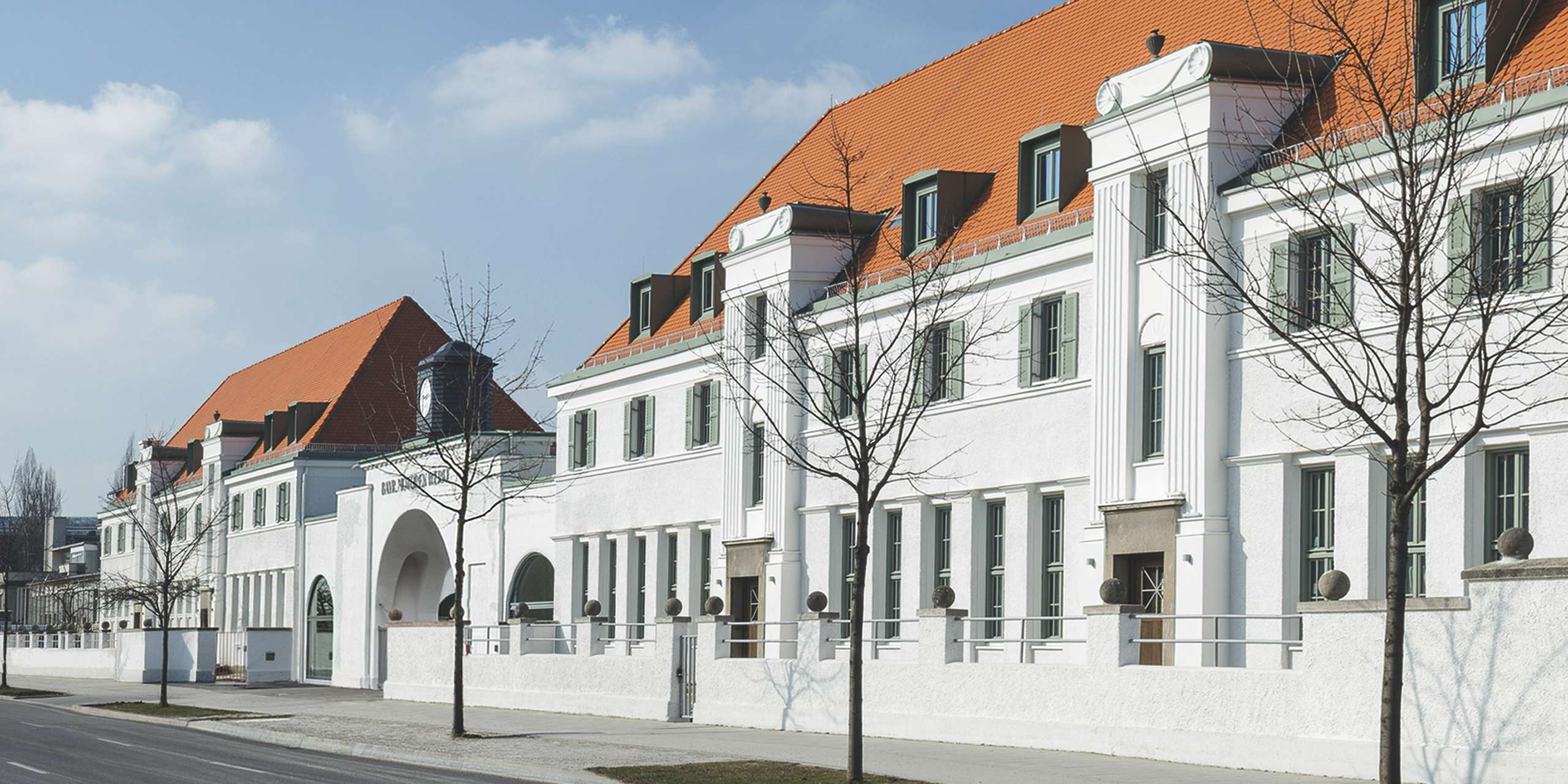
BMW Group Classic

The Moosacher Straße is an approximately 1.5 kilometres (0.93 mi) long street in the district Am Riesenfeld of Munich, Germany, north of the Olympiapark. It is the extension of the Frankfurter Ring.

== Description ==
The Knorr-Bremse headquarters, the BMW Group Classic museum and the Zentrale Hochschulsportanlage as well as the subway station Oberwiesenfeld are next to the street. At the Anhalter Platz (a town square) is a former World War II Bunker.

During the 1972 Olympics in Munich, the olympic press city was located at the Moosacher Straße.

The street is named after the district Moosach.
