= European delivery =

Automobile delivery in Europe

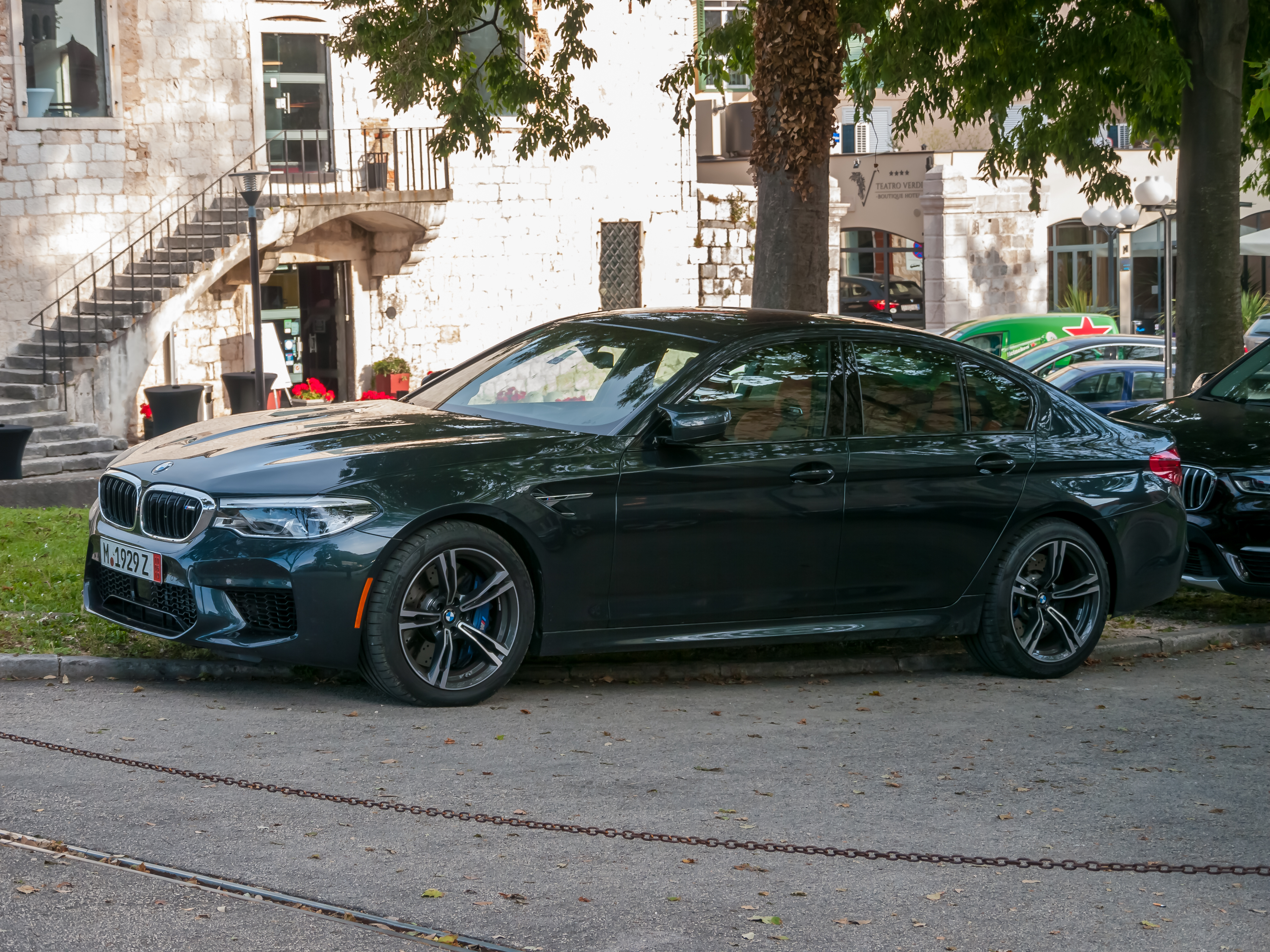
European delivery BMW M5 with temporary German registration in Croatia

European delivery programs are arrangements that continental European automobile manufacturers make with their dealerships throughout the world, to attract consumers who will combine the purchase of a European-made automobile with a trip to Europe. These are typically aimed at the North American market, which constitutes the most profitable market for Audi, Mercedes-Benz, BMW, Volvo and Porsche.

According to an article by Jonathan Spira, who has authored multiple articles on the topic, the programs have their origins going back to American GIs who brought European ("foreign") cars back with them starting in the 1950s. The advent of the jet age in the 1960s, allowing Americans to more easily take European vacations, was a further impetus to such programs.

== General description ==
The programs vary depending upon the manufacturer, but the programs tend to share certain commonalities such as reduced or free airfare for one or two persons to fly to Europe to tour the factory and take possession of their car. Such arrangements are typically made with the involvement of a dealership in the purchaser's country of origin. Once the purchaser takes possession of their automobile, he can typically tour with the car in Europe legally for up to five months. Depending on the manufacturer, it may be the purchaser's responsibility to ship their vehicle back to the purchaser's country of origin, but most carmakers make these arrangements on behalf of the buyer BMW, Mercedes-Benz, Porsche, and Volvo, according to their respective websites by having them drop it off at a designated shipping agent.

Manufacturers cite the program as a way to build customer loyalty, as few customers ever forget the European delivery experience or experience buyer's remorse. If combined with a vacation that was going to be had anyway, the European delivery program saves the traveler the cost of renting a car while in Europe. More importantly, customers have the opportunity of taking their cars (especially Grand Tourers) to exotic destinations such as the Côte d'Azur or Alps, where the roads are more scenic and challenging than their North American counterparts; indeed, European automakers often advertise their vehicles in such places. As well, German Autobahns have no speed restrictions compared to US and Canadian freeways, so this allows an auto enthusiast to fully exploit the potential of their high performance European cars legally.

European delivery is usually less expensive than taking delivery in a North American dealership, although Porsche charges a fee depending on the vehicle.

Audi ended its North American European Delivery program in 2018. BMW ended its program in 2020.

== Obstacles ==
European delivery is not available for European brand vehicles produced in North America, such as the BMW's and Mercedes-Benz' larger SUVs which are built at BMW's Spartanburg plant or Daimler's Tuscaloosa plant.

Japanese makers who, despite heavy manufacturing presence in North America, still assemble most North America-bound luxury and sports models in Japan, have yet to initiate a similar program. A theoretical program would probably face increased difficulty because, while not illegal to operate in Japan, vehicles for the North American market have their steering wheels on the opposite side of vehicles designed for the Japanese market, which would make operation somewhat more difficult. Another factor is the complications of registering a vehicle in Japan due to anti-congestion laws and severe traffic in Japan's major cities.

Despite being a former member of the European Union, which permits LHD and RHD vehicles to be registered in most member countries, British luxury automakers have similar difficulties in implementing such a program due to right-hand drive in Great Britain.
