= BMW Group Classic =

Automobile museum in Munich, Germany

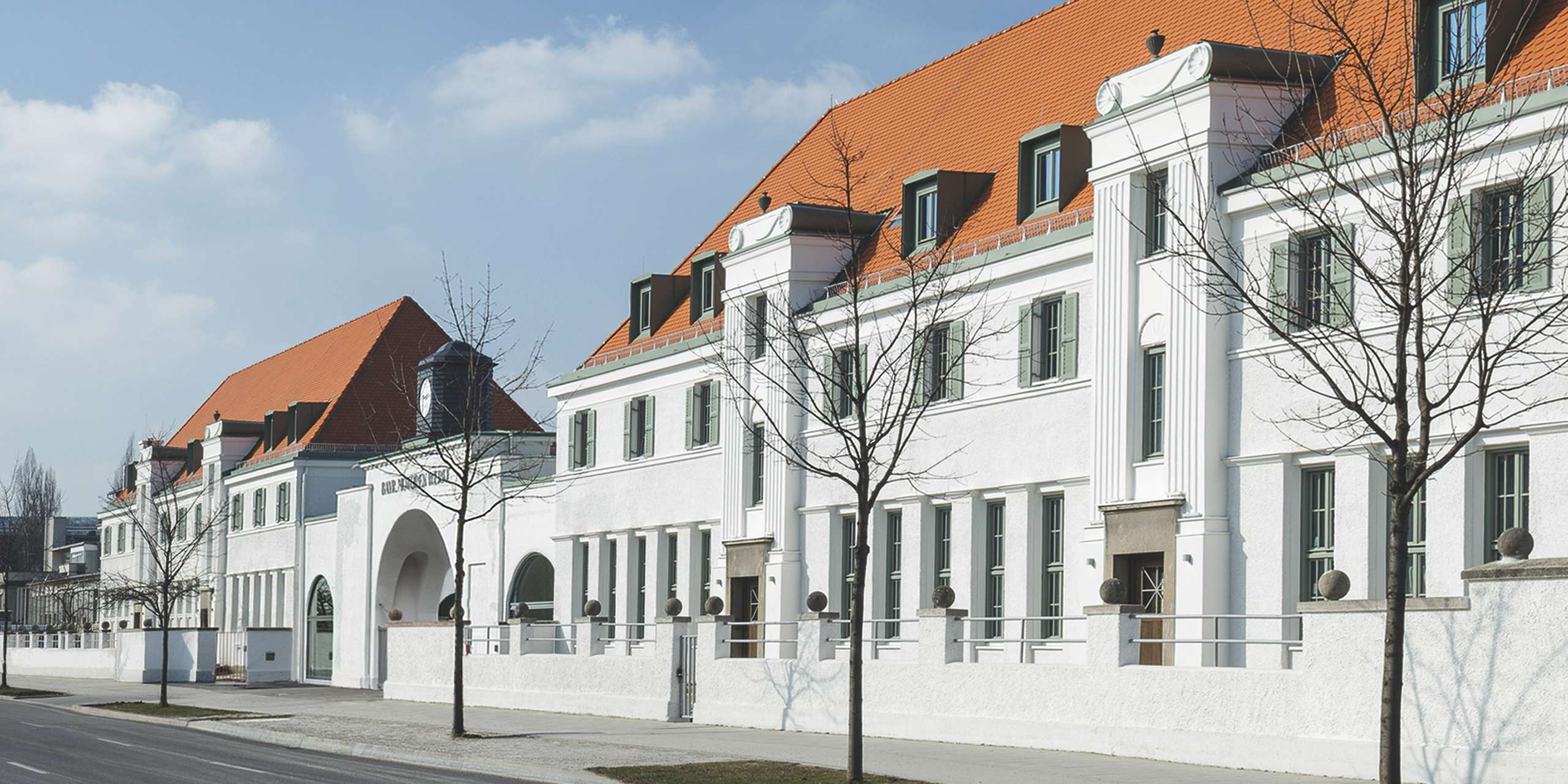
BMW Group Classic

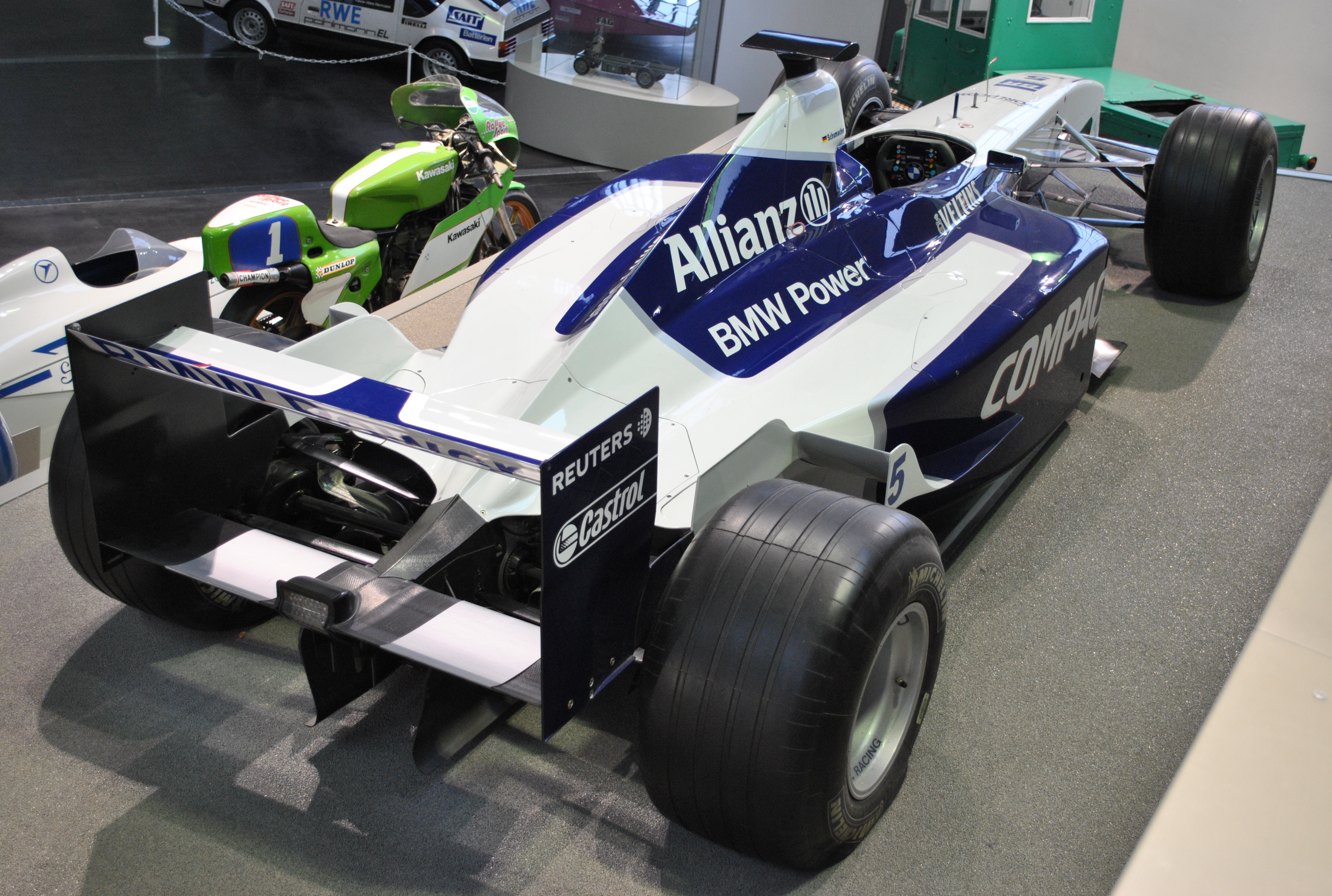
WilliamsF1 BMW FW23-05 Formula One-Racecar, Collection BMW Group Classic

BMW Group Classic is an automobile museum from BMW in Moosacher Straße 80 in Am Riesenfeld in Munich.

One can book guided tours to see historic cars of the collection. BMW Group Classic is the organizer of the Concorso d'Eleganza Villa d'Este.
