= Radstadion =

Velodrome in Munich, Germany

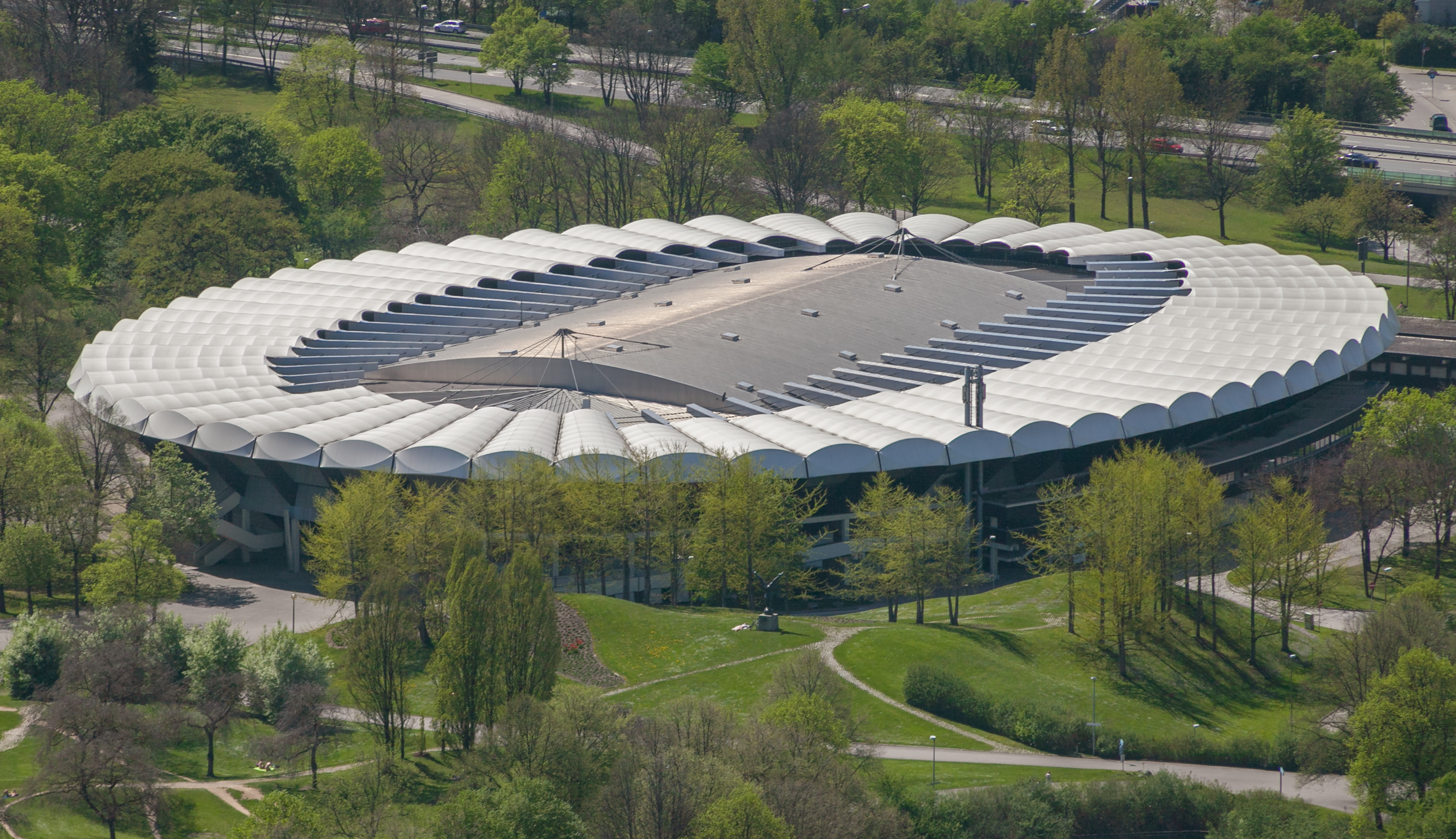
- Radstadion in April 2012
- Interactive map of Radstadion
- Location: Munich, Germany
- Coordinates: 48°10′11″N 11°32′28″E
- Surface: Premium wood
- Field size: 285.714 m (312.461 yd) track

Construction
- Built: 1970–1972
- Opened: 1972
- Closed: 2014
- Demolished: 2015

Radstadion was a velodrome located in Olympiapark in Munich, Germany. They hosted the track portion of the cycling competitions for the 1972 Summer Olympics.

The track was 285.714 metres (937 ft 5 in) long by 7 metres (23 ft) wide with banking that varied between 11.56 and 48.32 degrees.

== Demolition and new arena ==
The Radstadion was demolished in 2015 to make way for a new multi-purpose arena. The SAP Garden offers a maximum of 12,500 seats and cost around 100 million euros. It is the new home of the ice hockey club EHC Red Bull München and the basketball team of Bayern Munich. The construction of the new arena began in the winter of 2019 with the groundbreaking ceremony. The new building was designed by Danish architects 3XN. The costs are borne by the owner of the EHC Red Bull München, the Red Bull GmbH.

== See also ==
- List of cycling tracks and velodromes
