= Theatron-Festival =

German music festival

The admission-free music festival in Munich was first held in the early 1970s and attracts more than 100,000 visitors annually. With the "MusicSommer" program in August 2000, the event achieved an entry in the 2002 Guinness World Records as the "longest continuous music open air festival in the world".

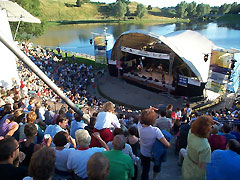
The "Theatron" stage with the characteristic shell-shelter roof, which was replaced in 2011.

== Venue ==
The festival is held at the Seebühne, which rises slightly to the west of the swimming pool in the lake of the Munich Olympic area. About 5,000 visitors can sit on the steps of the quarter-round amphitheater and the adjacent grass slopes, and can view the round concrete platform with a diameter of 20 meters and an area of 280 square meters. Due to the similar construction style of the ancient Greek theaters, the stage and event also received their names.

== History ==
The actual initiator of the music event was Jürgen Birr aka "Anurakta", on his part a Sannyasa-follower, who already in the summer 1973, one year after the 12. Olympic summer games, sporadically brought musicians to the sea stage in the Olympiapark for the first time. The audience therefore, for a long time, came from the hippie and Bhagvan movement. In 1974, Birr organized the first open-air "Theatron" concert with Artur Silber, a drummer of a band called Sonnenschiff and later in Central Park, together with the Jugendkulturwerk München and Einberg Musik Motor on 23 June with the band Sahara.

== Development ==
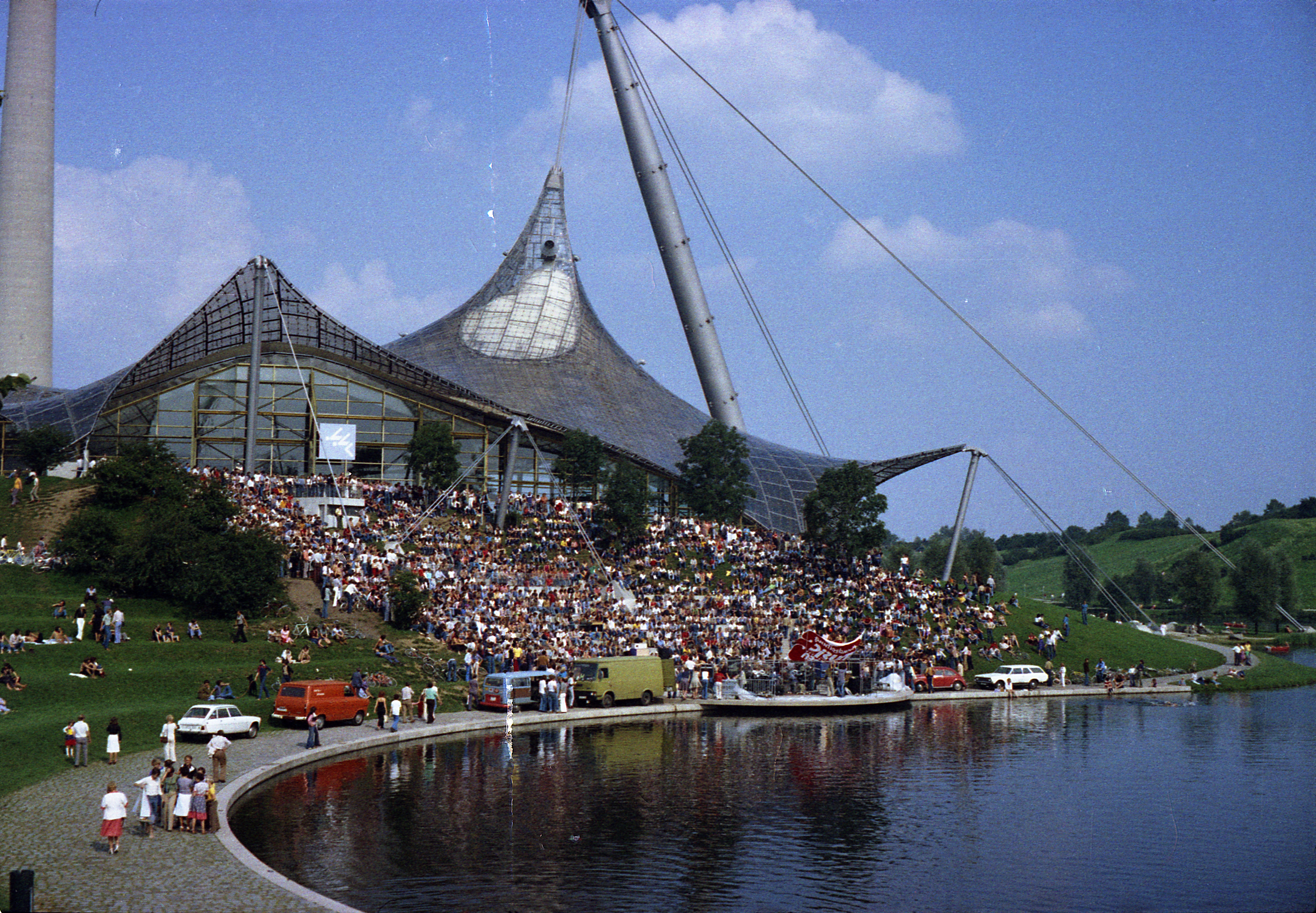
"Theatron" in the mid-1970s, at that time still without a stage construction

The first concerts were still performed on the empty concrete surface. Over the years, a mobile stage system for the artists with a roof was added and the equipment became more professional. In addition to the interpreters, who mostly came from the regional area, often also young talents, the "Theatron" presents more and more known celebrities, some of which were originally relatively unknown when they first performed there. Some of the best known performers of the "Theatron" include Scorpions, Eisbrecher, Sportfreunde Stiller, Culcha Candela, Mic, Etta Scollo, Bananafishbones, Megaherz, Fury in the Slaughterhouse, Christoph Weiherer, Passport, Emil Bulls, Pussybox, Ougenweide and Killerpilze. In 2004, Artur Silber handed over the event management to today's organizers Judith Becker and Antonio Seidemann, founder of EurArt.

As early as the beginning of the 1990s, the Theatron concerts, still known as "Theatron Rocksommer", took place all-day on Sunday. Through the changes in concept and the renaming to "Theatron MusikSommer" that all changed. The "Theatron" today is organized by the ARGE Theatron MusikSommer, which, in addition to the EurArt Festiviteitung, which takes place in alternating compilations of various free-lancers, commercial and communal organizers, including the Kulturreferat, the Youth Office, the Streetworkers, the Celebration Society, the Rock House Association and the Media Center Munich of the JFF Institute. In addition to the support of the Munich Olympiapark GmbH, the event is also supported by other sponsors.

The audience of the "Theatron" has long been composed of all population groups and age groups. Many visitors still bring their own beverages and food, even though mobile beer vendors accompany the event. For noise reasons the music events end at 10 pm and the average sound level on the mixing console is 90 dB(A).

At the Musiksommer 2015, for security reasons, the 60 centimeter raised dance floor in front of the stage was blocked off.

== Theatron MusikSommer ==
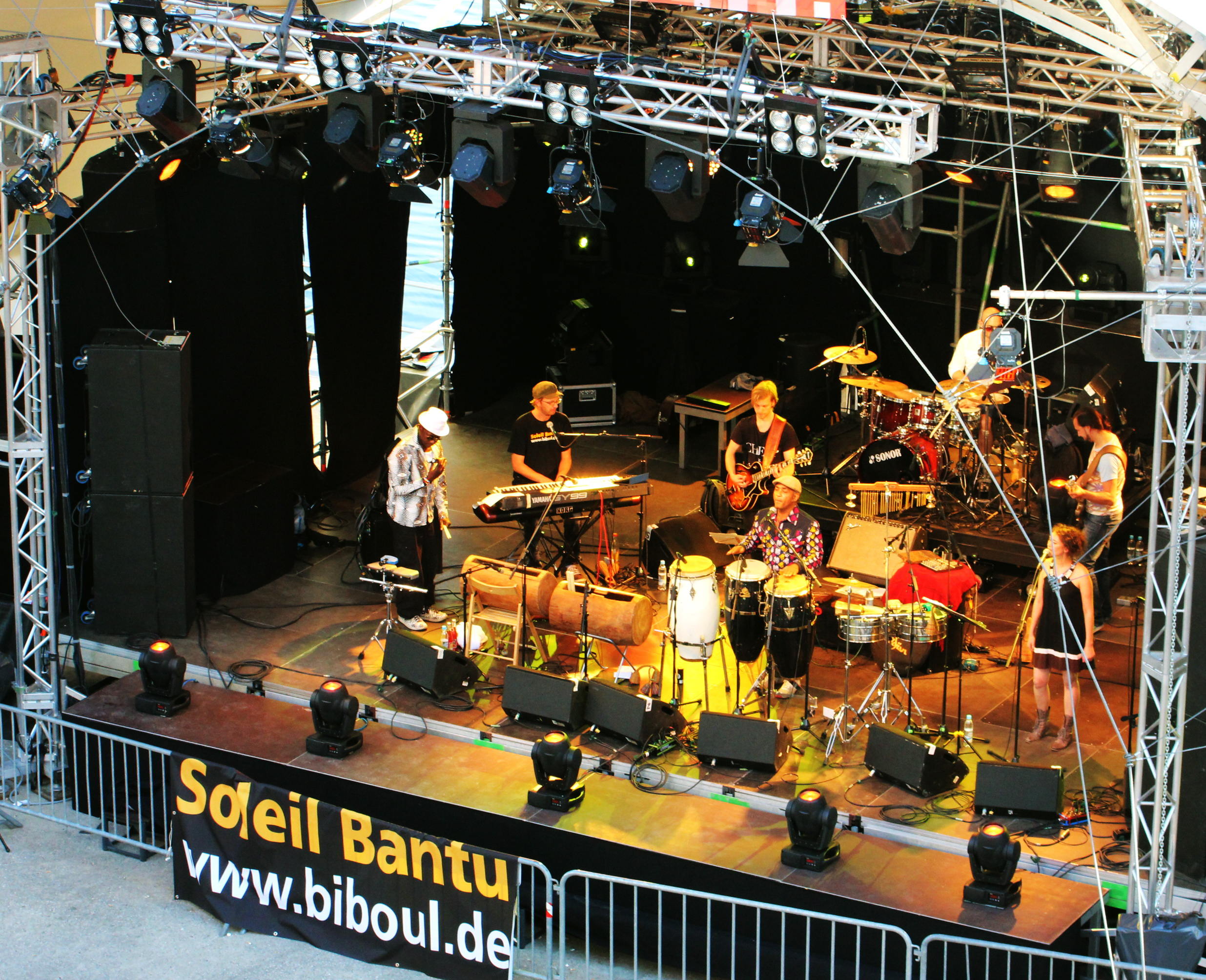
Soleil Bantu in July 2012

Probably since 1996 the actual series of events has been called "Theatron MusicSommer". The event takes place relatively simultaneously to the adjacent impark summer festival. For about a month, bands or singers of different musical genres and other artists perform every evening. Short films and other cultural programs also fill the stage program.

== Theatron PfingstFestival ==
The three-day Pentecost festival has supplemented the summer event since the year 2000. In 2007 it was supported for the first time by the BR-Jugend- und Szenemagazin Zündfunk and belonged to the Bavarian Open, which were then replaced by on3 (since 2013 pulse). In 2014, the event took place from 23 to 25 May, i.e. around 14 days before the Pentecost weekend. Among the participants were Gin Ga, Aloa Input, Matteo Capreoli, Farewell Dear Ghost, and Jesper Munk, who had already performed at the MusikSommer 2013.
