= SAP Garden =

Indoor arena in Germany

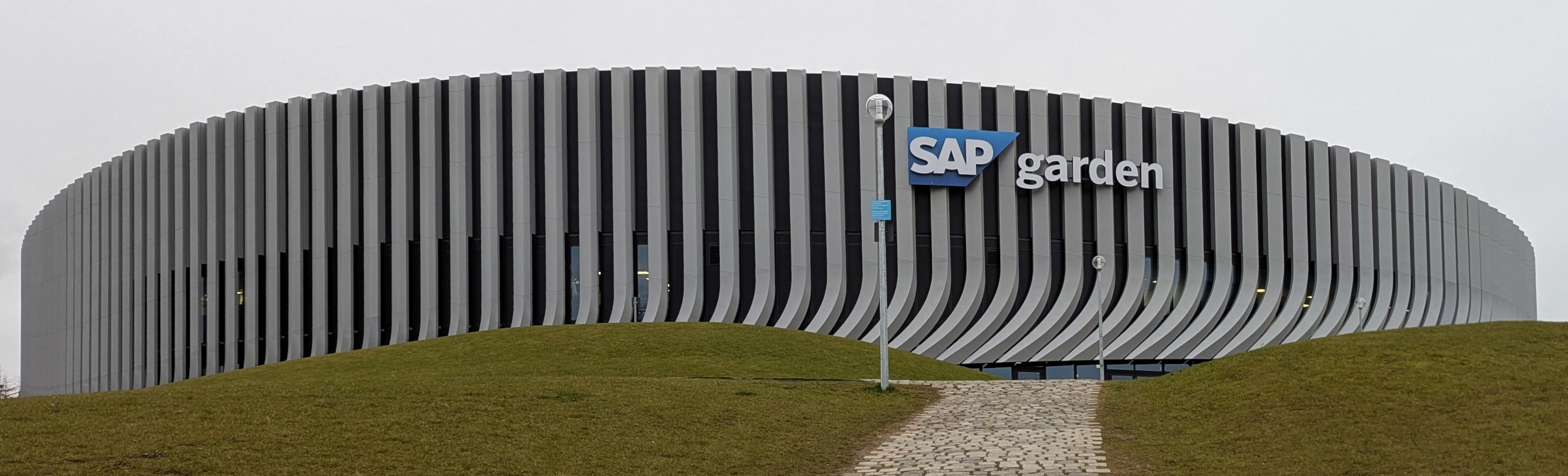
- SAP Garden in December 2024
- Interactive map of SAP Garden
- Location: Munich, Bavaria, Germany
- Coordinates: 48°10′11.57″N 11°32′27.53″E
- Owner: Red Bull GmbH
- Capacity: 11,500 (basketball); 10,796 (ice hockey)
- Executive suites: 11
- Public transit: at Olympiazentrum; at Gern; at Olympiapark West; at Toni-Merkens-Weg

Construction
- Groundbreaking: 23 February 2021
- Opened: 27 September 2024
- Cost: €110 million
- Architect: 3XN

Tenants
- Bayern Munich (BBL); EHC Red Bull Munich (DEL)

Website
- https://www.sapgarden.com/

SAP Garden is a 12,500-seat indoor arena, in Olympiapark, Munich, Germany. The arena was completed in summer 2024 and was ready for use for the 2024/25 season. The site was built at the location of the former Radstadion which was demolished in 2015. It is the home rink to ice hockey team EHC Red Bull Munich and home court to basketball team Bayern Munich.

== History ==
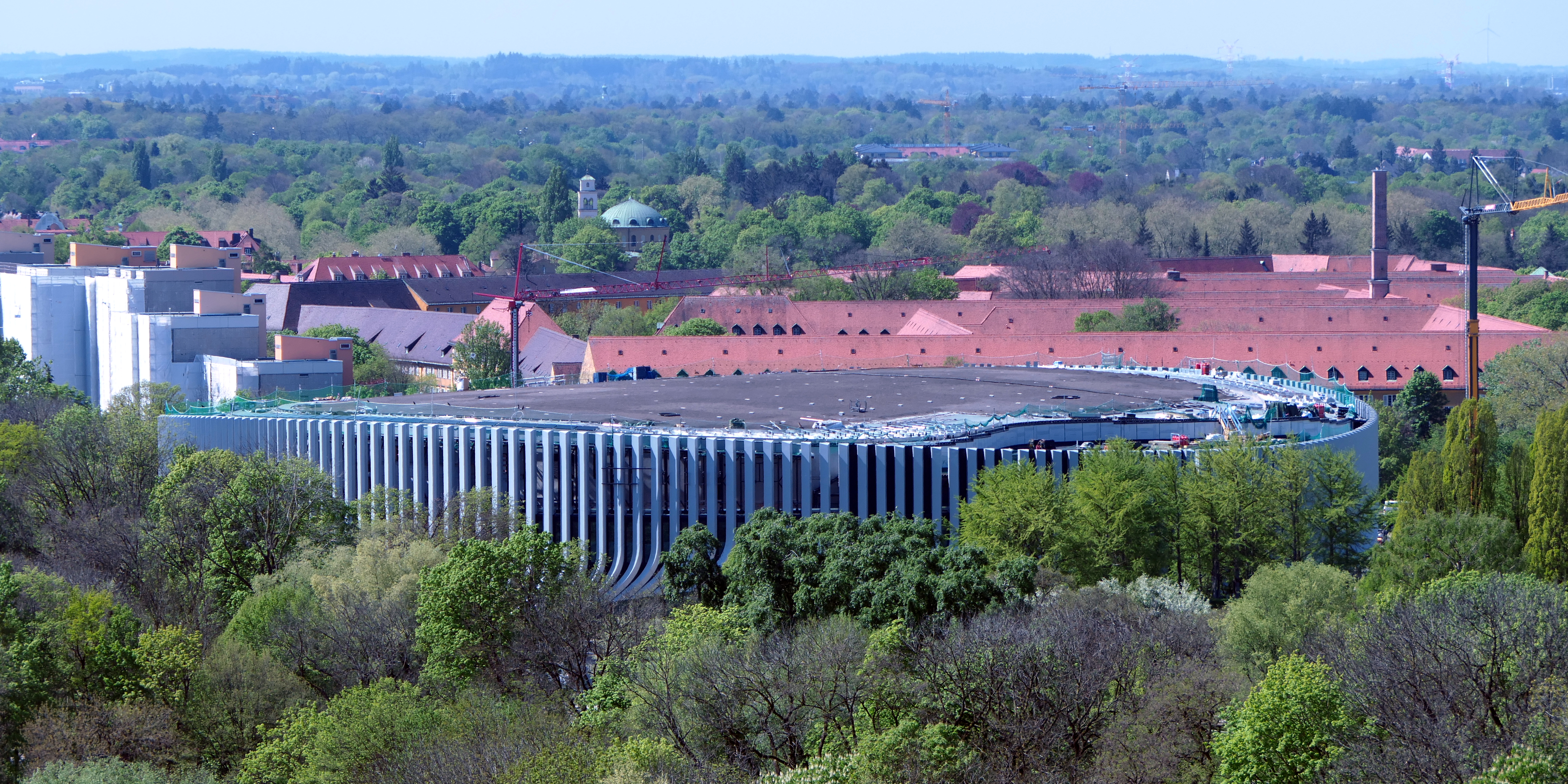
The arena in April 2024

Plans for a new indoor arena arose primarily from the wish for a new home arena for the ice hockey team EHC Red Bull Munich who were playing at the Olympia Eishalle which was opened five years prior to the 1972 Olympic Games. In addition, BBL team Bayern Munich, playing at the Olympic basketball arena, sought a modern arena. In December 2014, the city council of Munich announced bidding for the new arena, to be built at the location of the Radstadion. The architect is 3XN.

In 2019, it was reported that SAP gained naming rights for the arena. To avoid confusion with the SAP Arena in Mannheim, three naming proposals have been made to be voted under hashtag #NameGameOn: SAP Live (which received 9.9% of the votes), SAP Park (44.8%) and SAP Garden (45.3%).

Groundbreaking was originally announced to take place in the winter of 2019. The first excavation work on the site began on 13 January 2020. Furthermore, the construction of the provisional construction roads with sidewalks and a pedestrian crossing started, which made accompanying tree felling work necessary. A partial building permit was available for this. The foundation stone was laid on 23 February 2021, but without guests and visitors due to the COVID-19 pandemic.

The arena had its first game on 27 September 2024, with the Buffalo Sabres of the NHL defeating Red Bull Munich in an exhibition game, 5-0. Former Red Bull player, current Sabres player, and Munich native JJ Peterka led the teams onto the ice and was given a solo lap, and Peterka scored the fifth goal for the Sabres, receiving an ovation as well as chants postgame.

Olympic Park Munich
Olympic Park Munich
1 Olympic Stadium
2 Olympic Hall
3 Theatron
4 Aquatic Center
5 Small Olympic Hall
6 Olympic Tower
7 Olympic Ice Sports Center
8 Olympic Village
9 SAP Garden
10 Olympic Mountain

== See also ==
- List of indoor arenas in Germany
