= Erinnerungsort Olympia-Attentat =

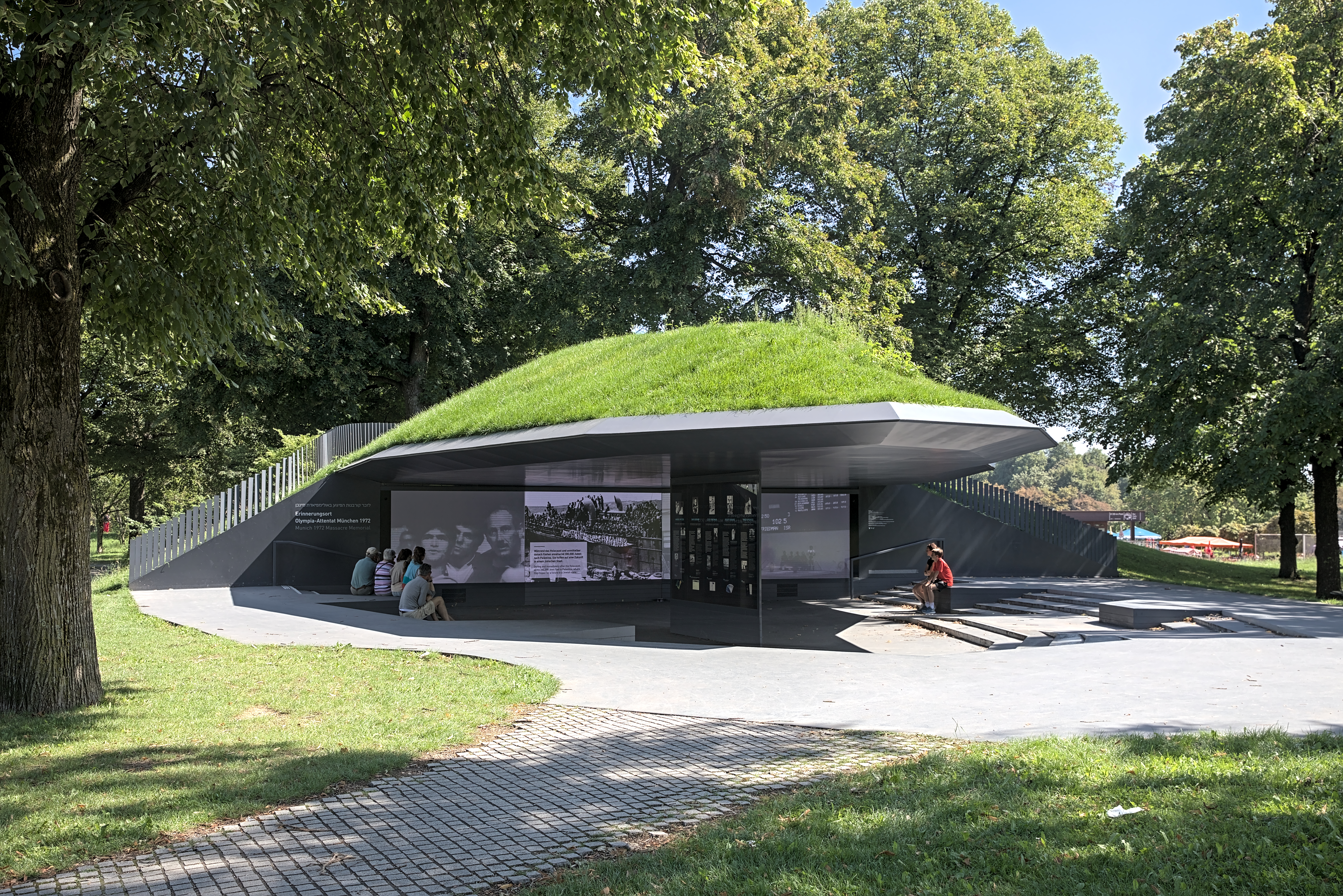
- Erinnerungsort Olympia-Attentat
- Location: Munich Olympiapark, Munich, Germany
- Coordinates: 48°10′40″N 11°33′00″E
- Type: Memorial
- Opening date: September 6, 2017
- Dedicated to: Victims of the Munich massacre

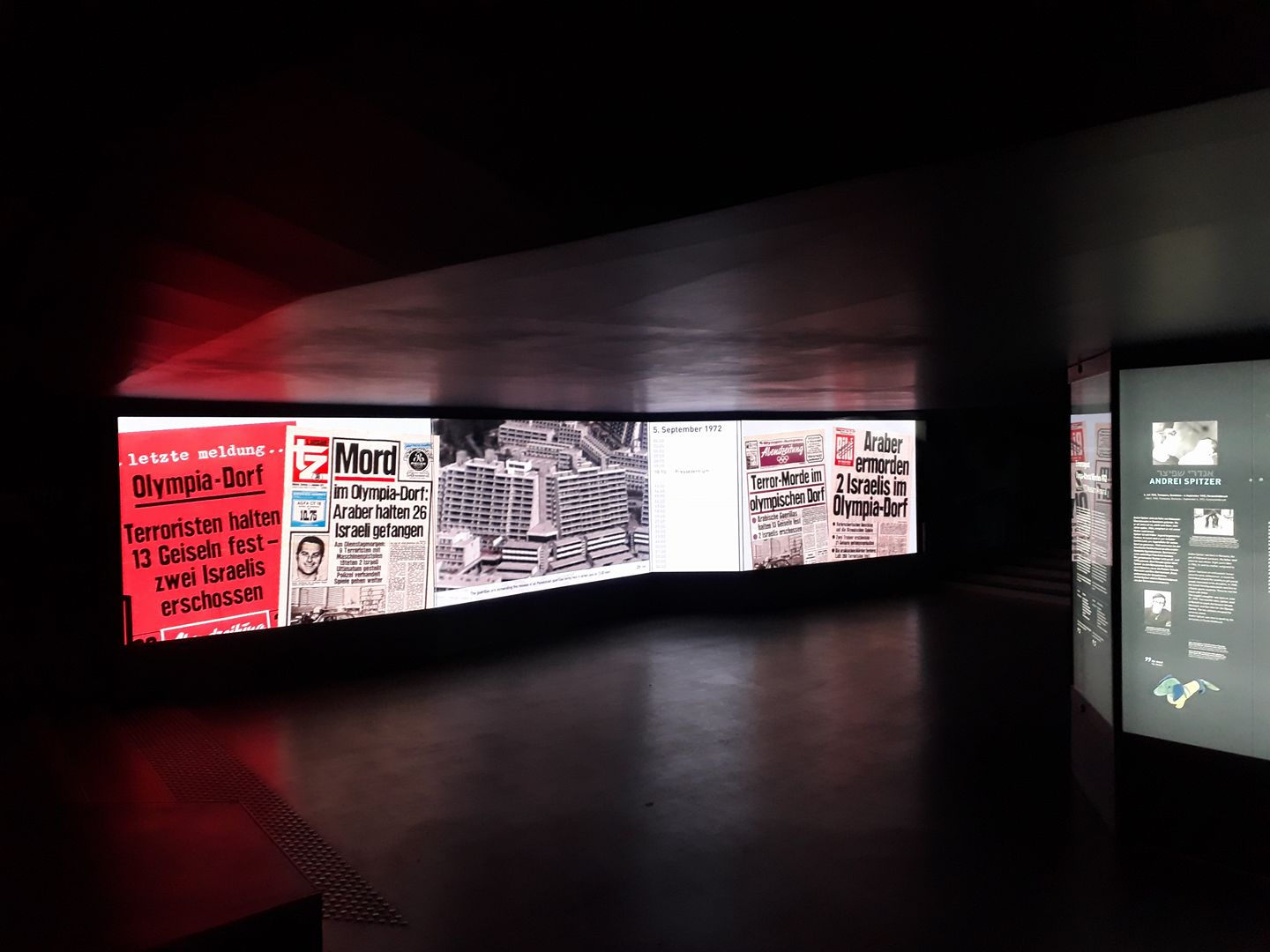
Video installation

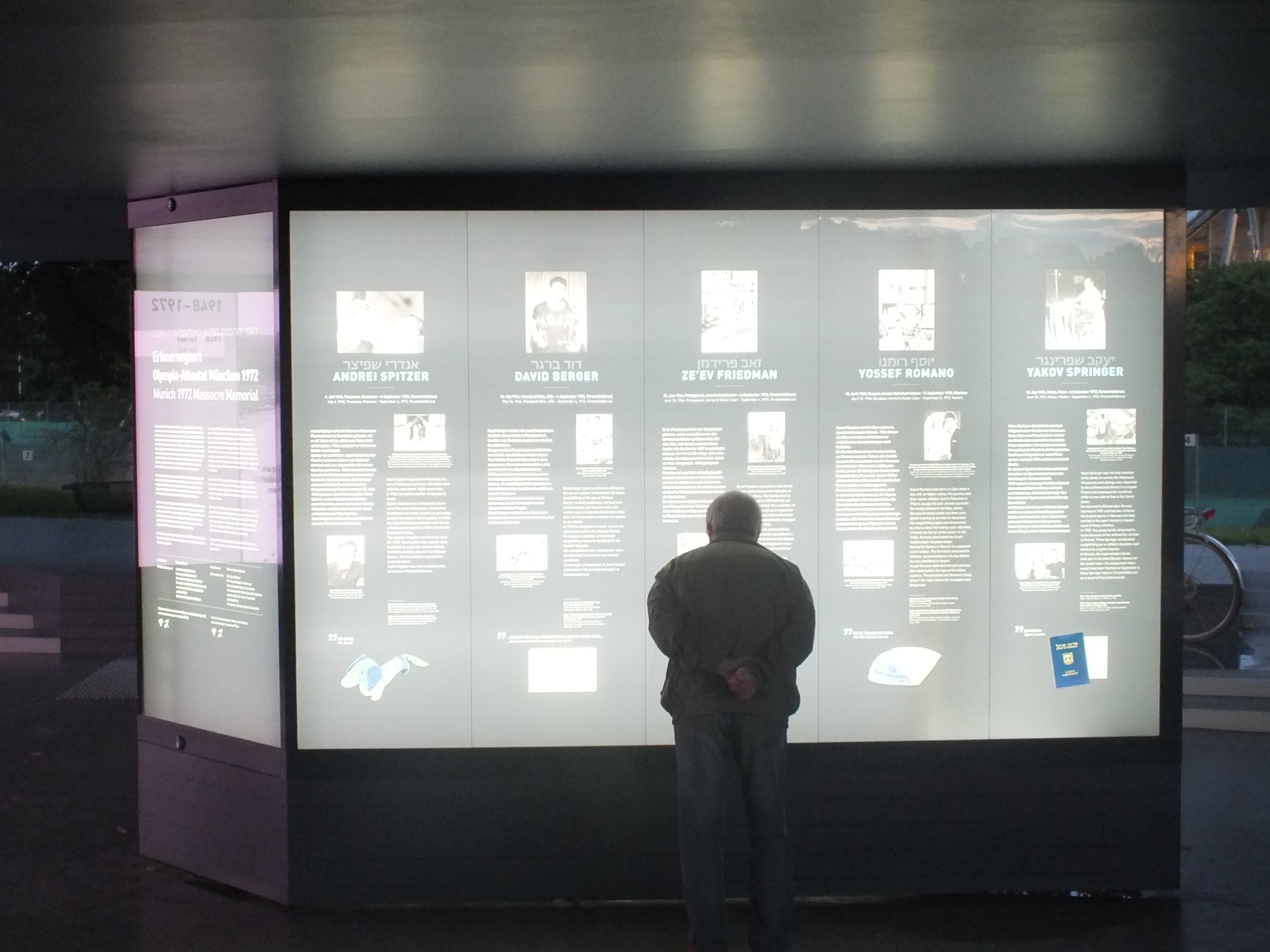

The Erinnerungsort Olympia-Attentat (English: Place of Memory: Olympic Terrorist Attack) is a memorial in the Munich Olympiapark for the victims of the Munich massacre during the 1972 Summer Olympics in Munich, West Germany, at which eleven Israeli Olympic team members were taken hostage and eventually killed, along with a German police officer, by the Palestinian terrorist group Black September.

The 10 minutes long 11 meter width Video Installation loop is shown each day from 8 to 22 o'clock. Language is German with English subtitles. The memorial was opened on September 6. 2017 by the President of Israel Reuven Rivlin and President of Germany Frank-Walter Steinmeier.
