= Münchner Sommernachtstraum =

Annual show event in Munich, Bavaria, Germany

Coordinates: 48°10′26″N 11°32′56″E

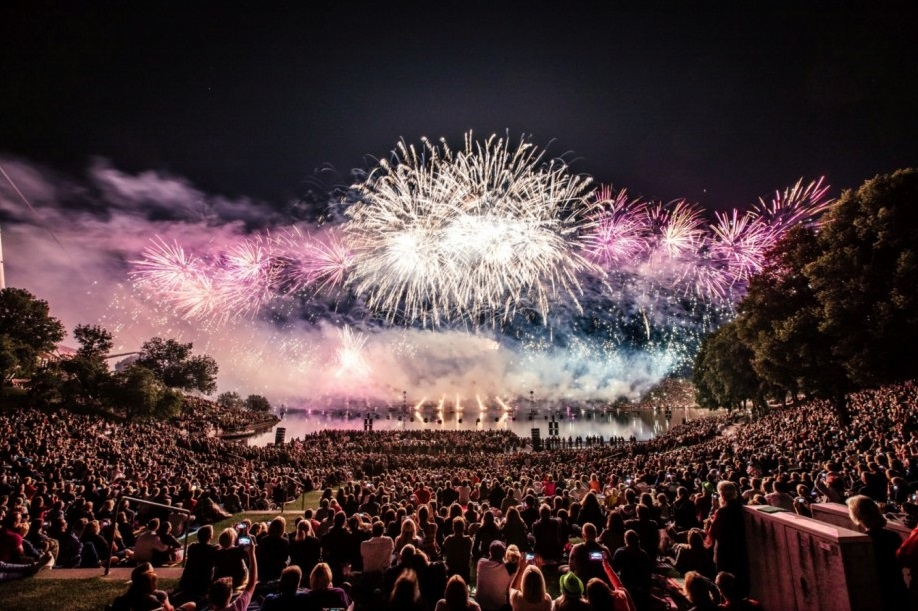
Music fireworks at the Münchner Sommernachtstraum 2018

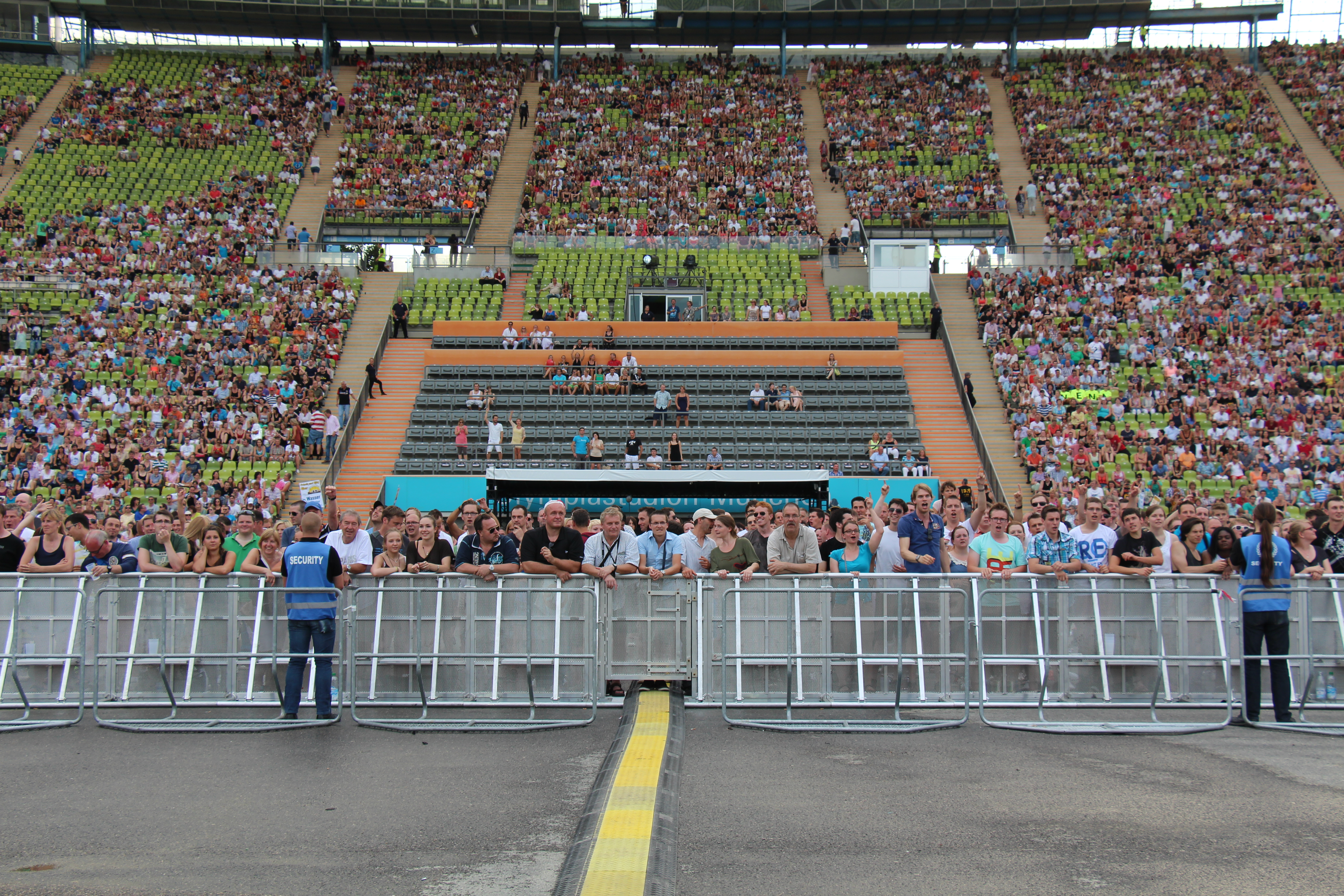
Spectators at the Münchner Sommernachtstraum 2013

The Münchner Sommernachtstraum (Munich Midsummer Nights Dream) is a show event that has been held annually in July since 2004 in Olympiapark.

== Description ==
The Münchner Sommernachtstraum consists of live concerts and a 35-minute musical fireworks display. So far, bands like the Spider Murphy Gang, Münchener Freiheit, Scooter, Rainhard Fendrich, Haindling, Nena, Heino, DJ Antoine, Milk & Sugar, Billy Idol, Rea Garvey or Cro.

In 2006, the Münchner Sommernachtstraum had received 60,000 visitors. In 2008, the year of the 850th Munich City Birthday, the Munich Midsummer Nights Dream set a new visitor record with 63,000 visitors.

In 2017, the event was more compact in order to avoid long walking distances for visitors. Once again, a two-stage concept was implemented with a main stage on Coubertinplatz and an "Inselbeat stage" on the eastern shore of the Olympic lake.

The event was attended by 25,000 people.

In 2019 the Münchner Sommernachtstraum was the largest firework display in Germany to date, with approximately 11,000 individual ignitions and 4 tons of pyrotechnics.
