= Olympia Schwimmhalle =

Aquatics centre in Munich, Germany

- Interactive map of Olympia Schwimmhalle
- Full name: Olympia Schwimmhalle
- Address: Munich, Germany
- Coordinates: 48°10′25″N 11°33′6″E
- Capacity: 1,500

Construction
- Architects: Behnisch & Partner

Olympic Park Munich
Olympic Park Munich
1 Olympic Stadium
2 Olympic Hall
3 Theatron
4 Aquatic Center
5 Small Olympic Hall
6 Olympic Tower
7 Olympic Ice Sports Center
8 Olympic Village
9 SAP Garden
10 Olympic Mountain

The Olympia Schwimmhalle is an aquatics centre located in the Olympiapark in Munich, Germany. It hosted the swimming, diving, water polo, and the swimming part of the modern pentathlon events at the 1972 Summer Olympics. At the Olympics, the stadium had a 9000-seat temporary capacity which was reduced to 1,500 soon afterwards. During the 1972 Summer Olympics, in the 29 Olympic swimming events, all the Olympic Records were broken and 20 new World Records were achieved.

== Construction ==
The Schwimmhalle is unique for its roof construction, which is a lightweight stressed-skin structure. This curved structure bears loads through tension only, not compression. The double curvature in the roof design provides the support, which is further stabilized through pre-tensioned guy wires.

== History ==
The Olympia Schwimmhalle is where Australian teenager Shane Gould won three gold medals, a silver medal and a bronze, at the 1972 Summer Olympics, becoming the first woman swimmer to win five individual medals. Swimmer Mark Spitz broke the record for most individual gold medals won in a single Olympics with seven gold medals. This record was not surpassed until fellow American swimmer Michael Phelps won eight gold medals at the 2008 Summer Olympics in Beijing.

== Gallery ==
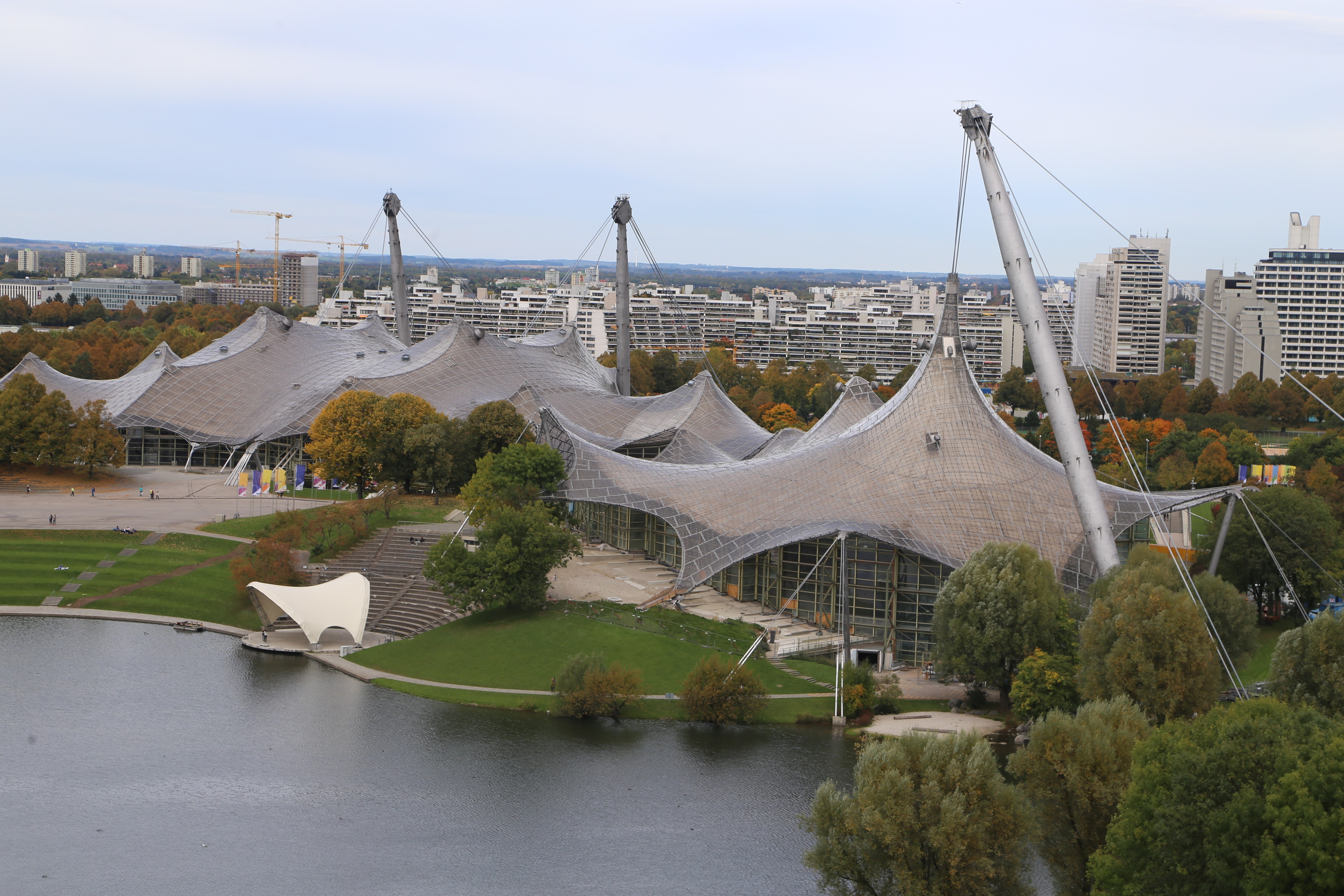
Unique roof structure (2017)

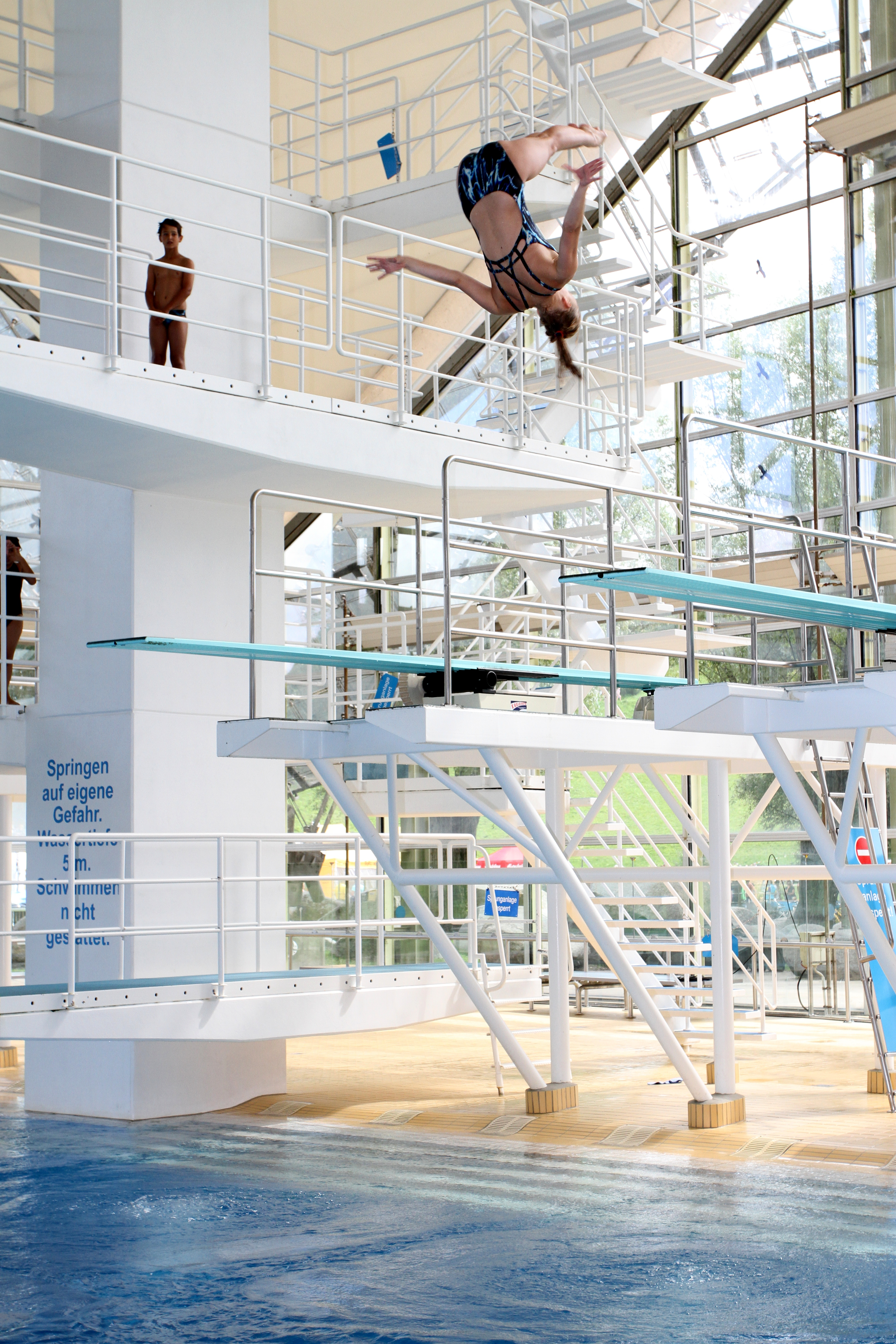
The diving tower

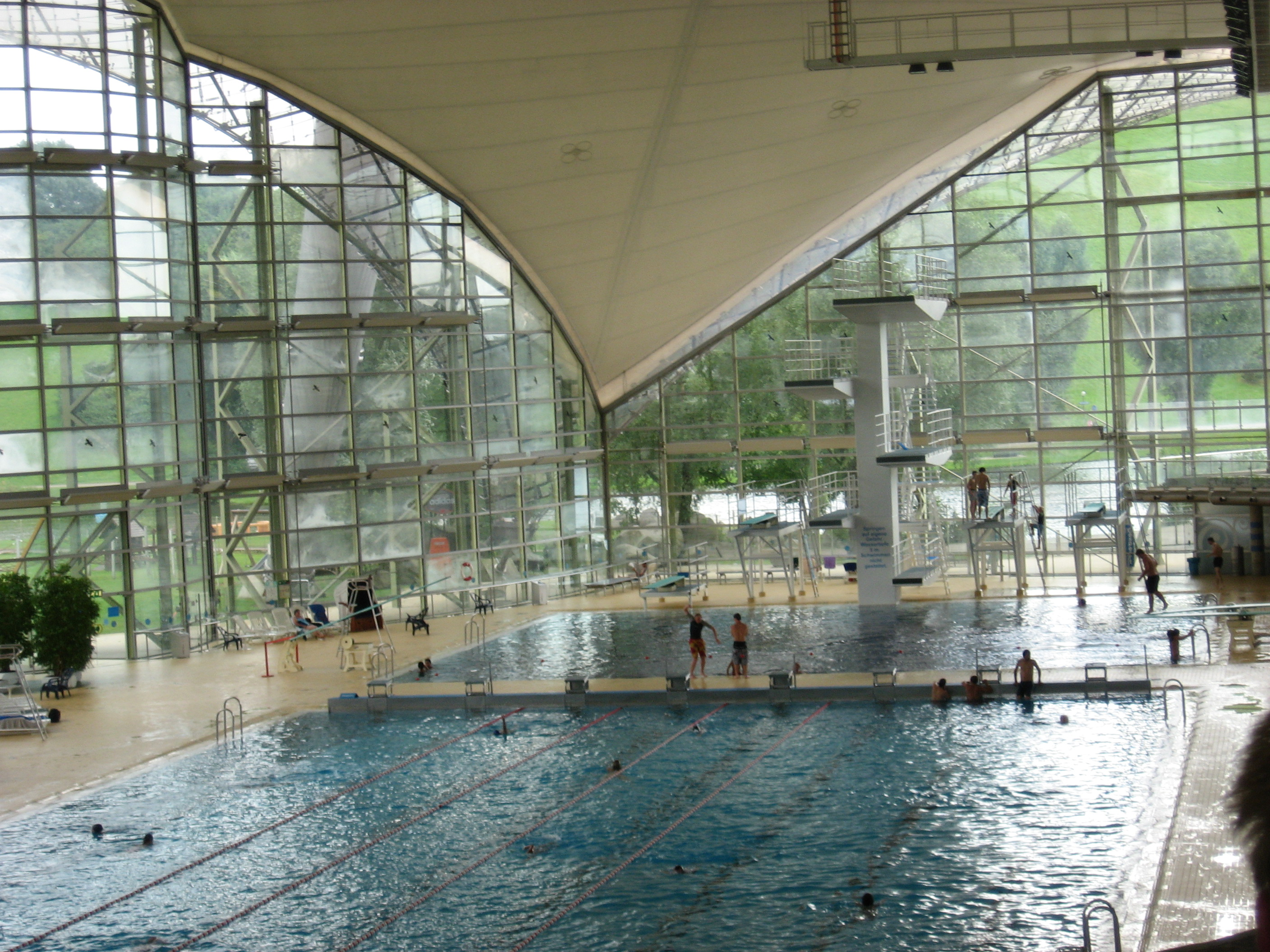
View of the diving and competition pools

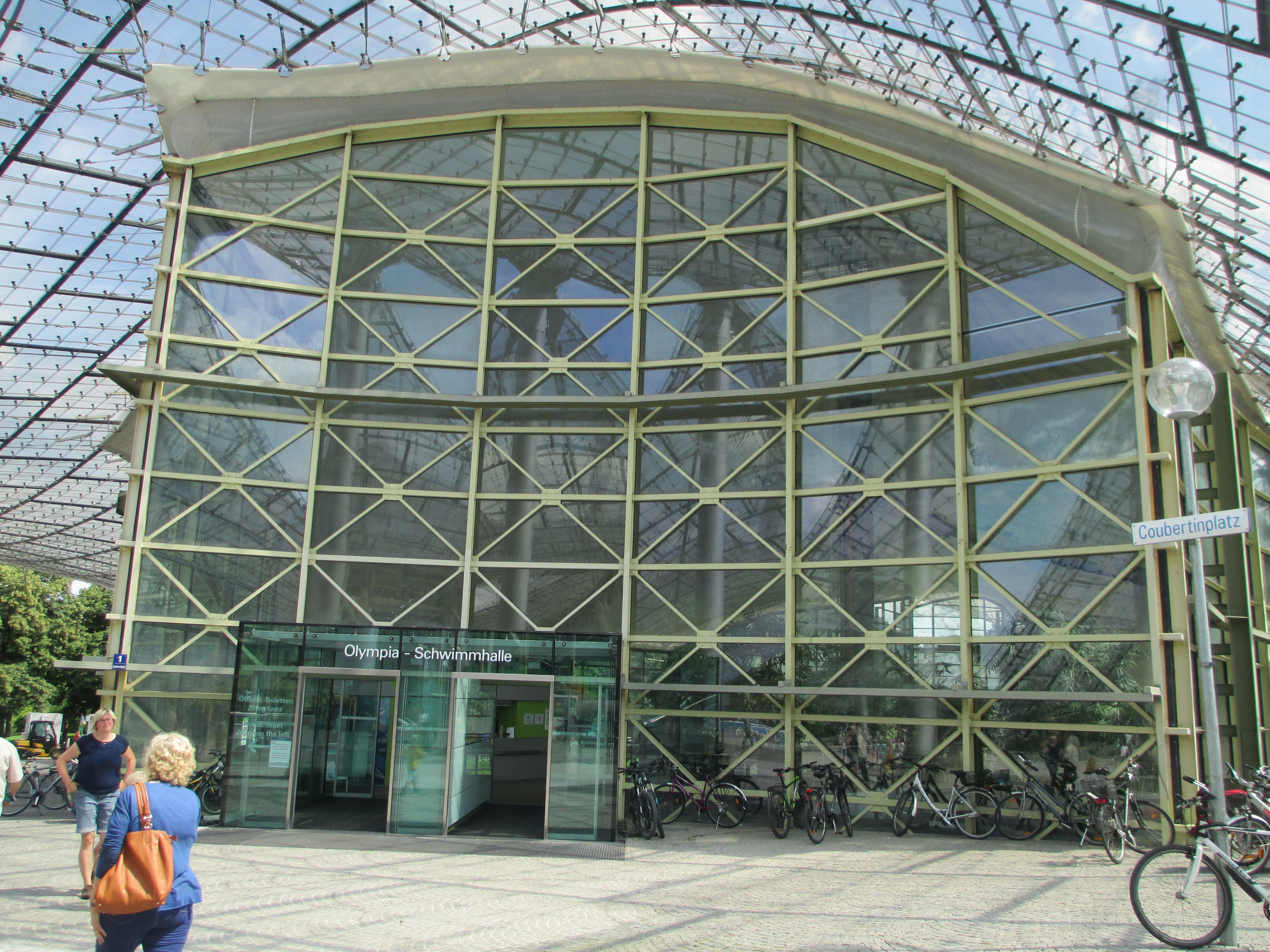
Entrance to the swim hall
