= Olympiaturm =

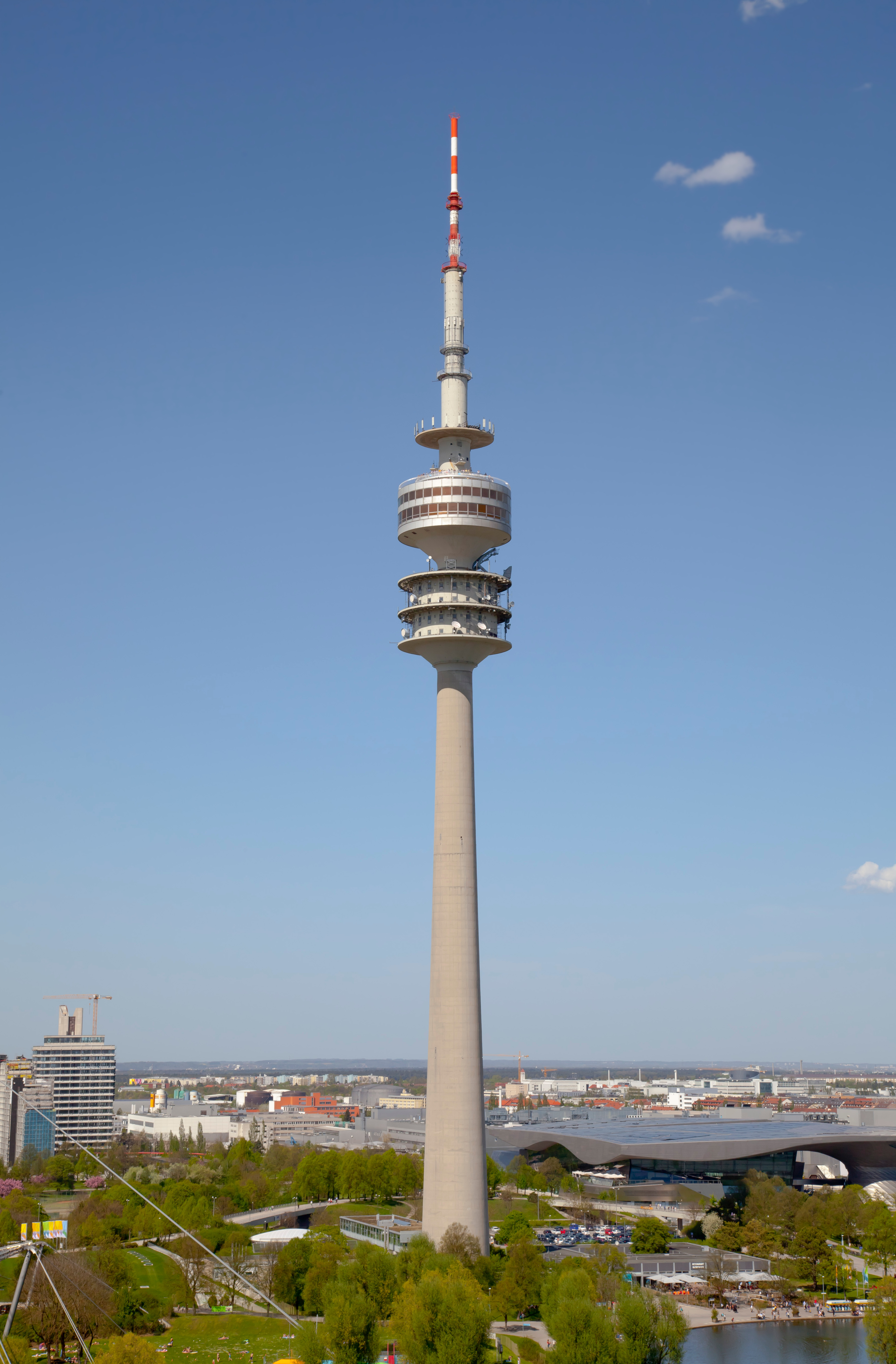
- Interactive map of the Olympiaturm area

General information
- Location: Munich, Germany
- Coordinates: 48°10′28″N 11°33′13″E
- Completed: 1968

Height
- Antenna spire: 291 m (955 ft)
- Top floor: 182 m (597 ft)

Technical details
- Lifts/elevators: 2

The Olympic Tower (German: Olympiaturm) in the Olympic Park, Munich has an overall height of 291 m (955 ft) and a weight of 52,500 tons. At a height of 190 m (620 ft) there is an observation platform as well as an exhibition commemorating the 50th anniversary of the Tower. Previously in that space was a small rock-and-roll museum housing various memorabilia. Since its opening in 1968, the tower has registered over 43 million visitors (as of 2018). At a height of 182 m (597 ft) there is a revolving restaurant, which seats 230 people. A full revolution takes 53 minutes. The tower also serves as a broadcast tower, and has one Deutsche Telekom maintenance elevator with a speed of 4 m/s (13 ft/s), as well as two visitor lifts with a speed of 7 m/s (23 ft/s) which have a capacity of about 30 people per car. The travel time is about 30 seconds. The tower is open daily from 09:00 to 24:00.

There is a concept of making virtual reality weather timelapse service from Olympiaturm. In case it were implemented, it would become the first tower worldwide with such function.

== Gallery ==
Olympic Park Munich
Olympic Park Munich
1 Olympic Stadium
2 Olympic Hall
3 Theatron
4 Aquatic Center
5 Small Olympic Hall
6 Olympic Tower
7 Olympic Ice Sports Center
8 Olympic Village
9 SAP Garden
10 Olympic Mountain
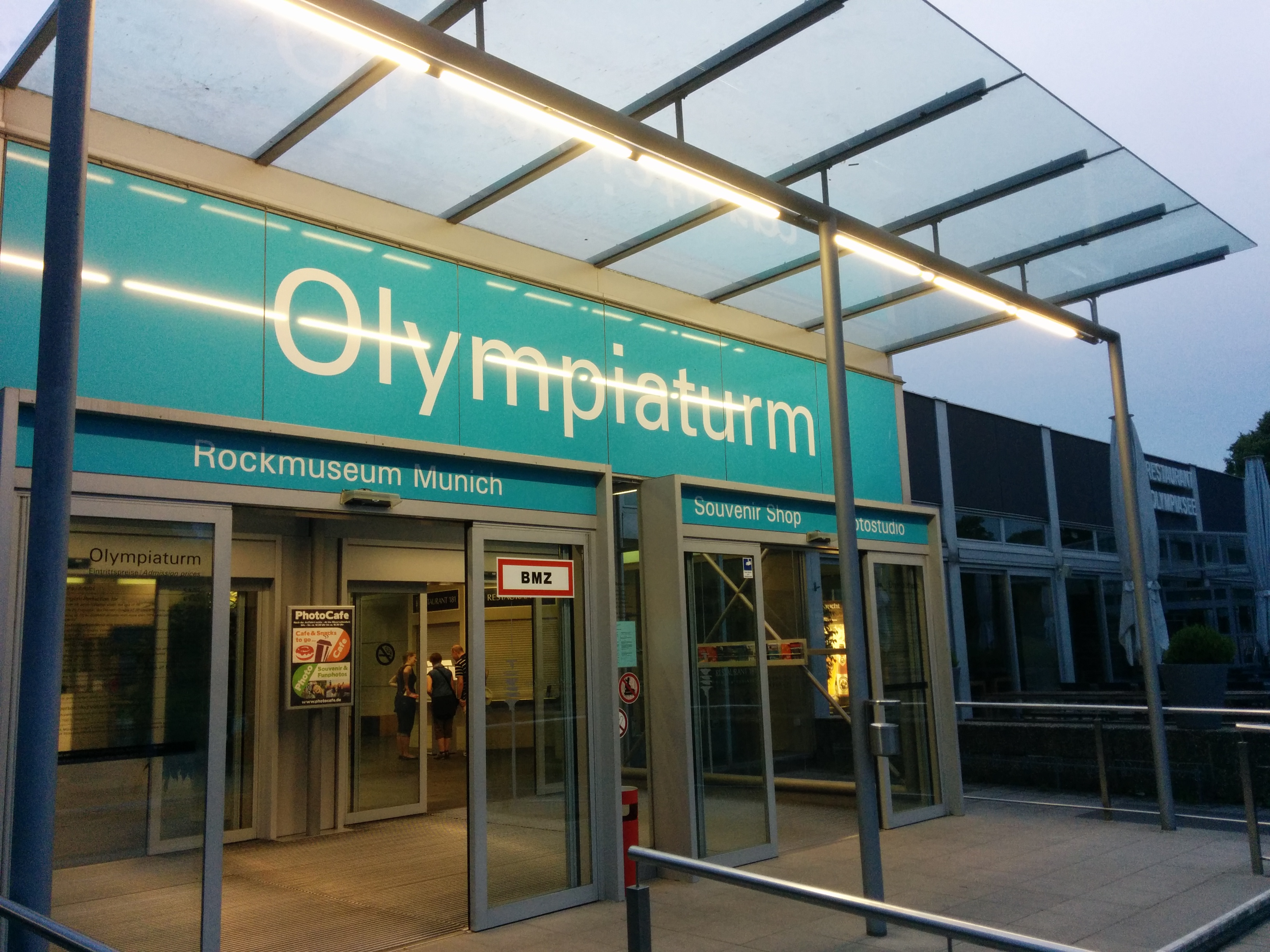
Entrance

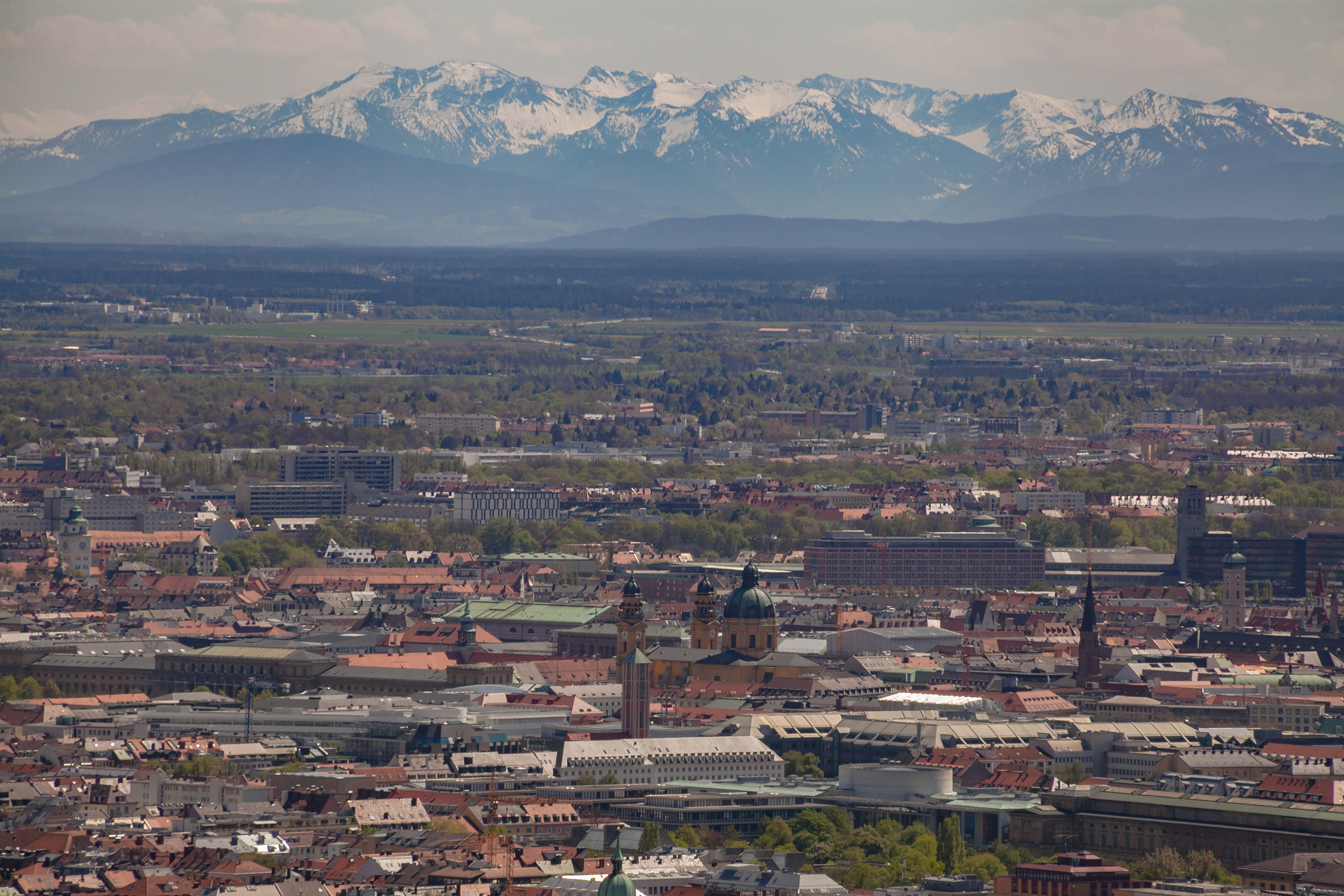
A view from the tower's observation platform towards the Alps.

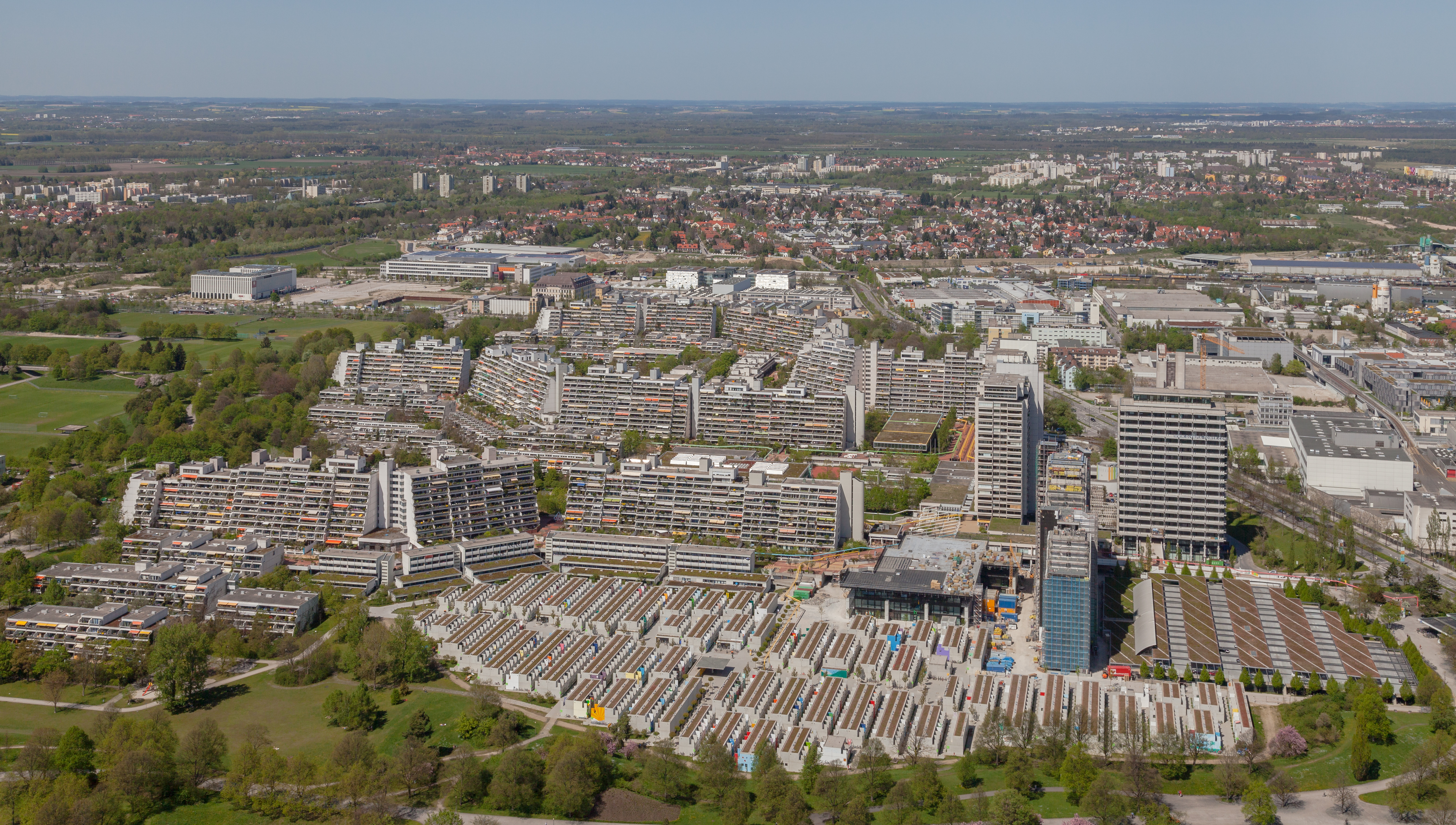
A view from the tower's observation platform of the adjacent Olympic Village.

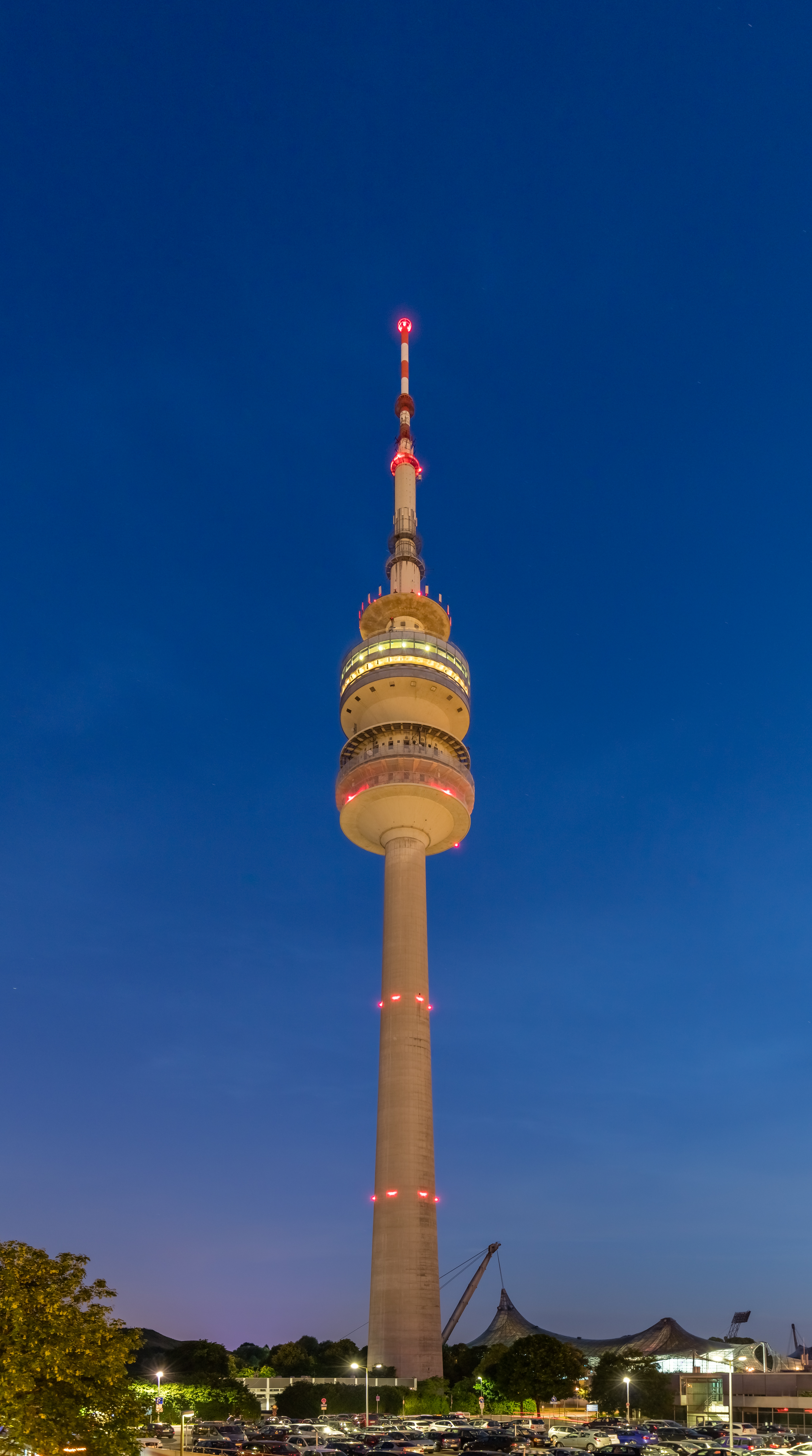
Night view

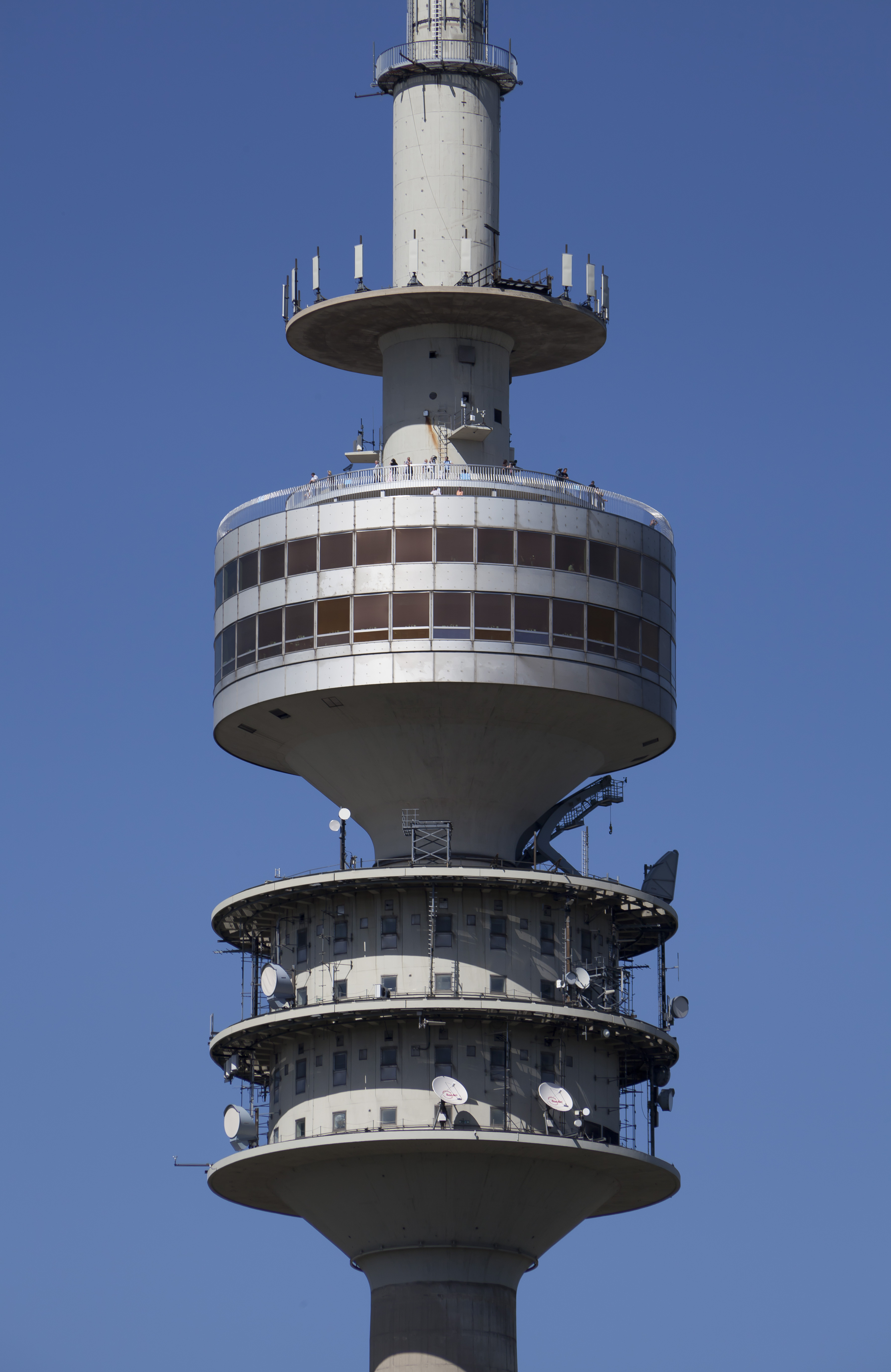
Detail of the top

== List of channels ==
The following radio and television stations broadcast from the Olympiaturm.

=== Analogue FM radio ===
- 89 MHz: Radio 2Day
- 92.4 MHz: Radio Horeb/Radio Lora/Radio Feierwerk/Münchner Kirchenradio/CRM/Radio München
- 93.3 MHz: Energy München
- 95.5 MHz: 95,5 Charivari
- 96.3 MHz: Gong 96.3
- 101.3 MHz: Antenne Bayern
- 107.2 MHz: Klassik Radio

=== Digital radio (DAB)/Digital mobile television (DMB) ===
- Block 11D: 222.064 MHz (DAB)
  - Deutschlandfunk
  - Deutschlandradio Kultur
  - Nova Radio
  - Digital Classix/Radio Opera
  - Fantasy Bayern
  - Gong Mobil
  - Radio DeLuxe
  - Bayern 1
  - Bayern 2 plus
  - Bayern 3
  - Das Erste (DMB)
- Block 12D: 229.072 MHz (DAB)
  - Bayern 2 plus
  - Bayern 4 Klassik
  - B5 plus
  - Bayern plus
  - On3radio
  - BR Traffic News
  - Rock Antenne
  - Radio Galaxy

=== Digital television (DVB-T) ===
- UHF 26: 514 MHz
  - DVB-H Mobile 3.0 test
- UHF 34: 578 MHz - RTL Group
  - RTL Television
  - RTL II
  - Super RTL
  - VOX
- UHF 35: 586 MHz - ZDF
  - ZDF
  - 3sat
  - ZDFinfokanal
  - KI.KA/ZDFneo
- UHF 48: 690 MHz - ProSiebenSat.1 Media
  - ProSieben
  - Sat.1
  - kabel eins
  - N24
- UHF 52: 722 MHz: Mixed private channels
  - Euronews
  - münchen.tv
  - HSE24
- UHF 54: 738 MHz - ARD national programming
  - Das Erste (BR)
  - arte
  - Phoenix
  - EinsPlus
- UHF 56: 754 MHz - ARD/BR regional programming (South Bavaria)
  - Bayerisches Fernsehen (Swabia/Old Bavaria)
  - BR-alpha
  - SWR Fernsehen (Baden-Württemberg)
  - Das Erste (BR) - DVB-H test

=== Ham radio and television ===
- Callsign DB0EL
  - UHF FM relay: 439.275 MHz (International Echolink Network #7385)
  - SHF FM relay: 1298.2 MHz
  - APRS digipeater: 144.8 MHz
- Callsign DB0TVM
  - D-Star relay: 439.975 MHz
  - Amateur television relay: 10194 and 24120 MHz

== See also ==
- List of towers
