= Olympiapark (Munich) =

Urban park in Munich

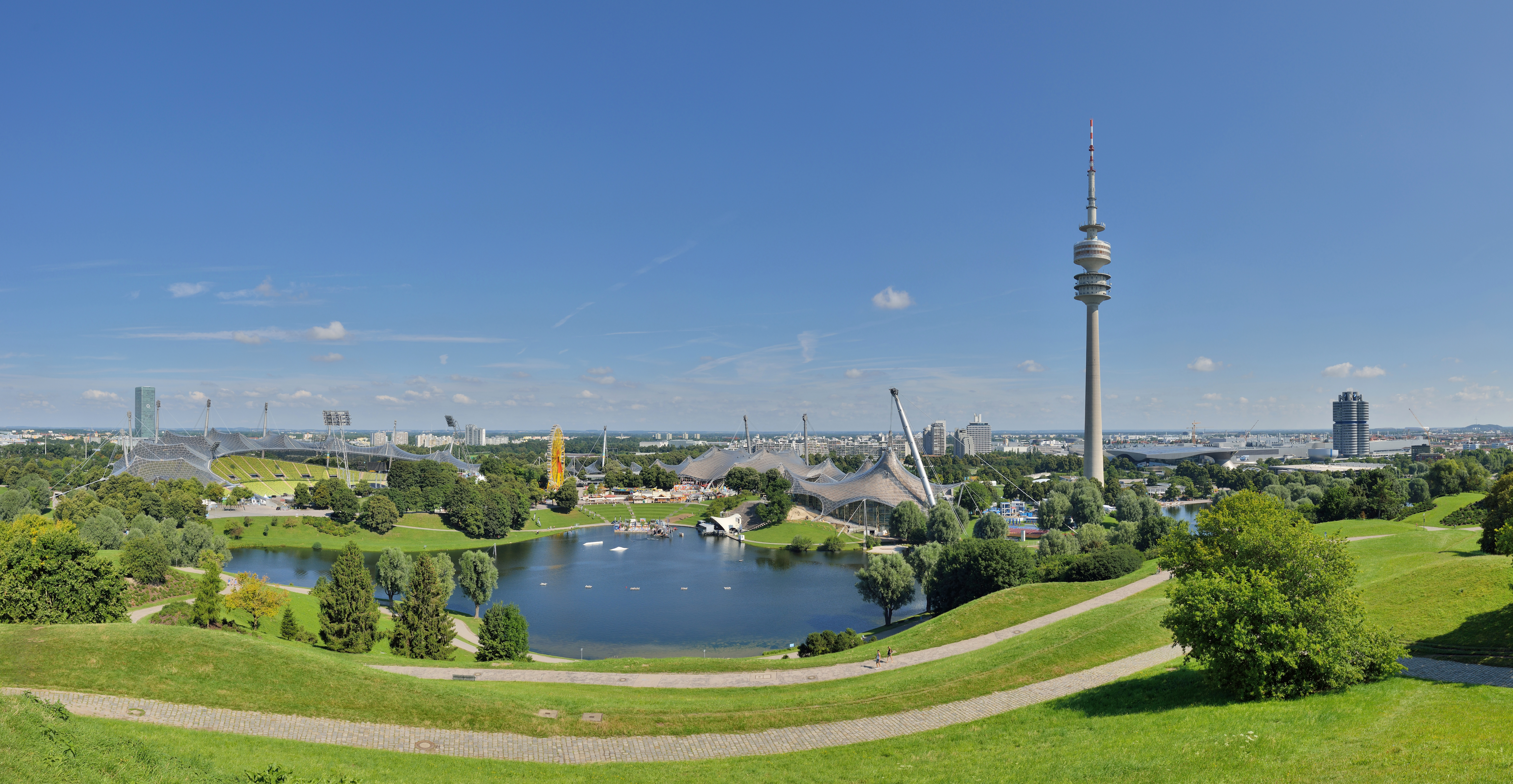
- Olympiapark
- Interactive map of Olympiapark
- Type: Urban park
- Location: Munich, Bavaria, Germany
- Coordinates: 48.17°N 11.55°E
- Area: 0.85 km^{2} (0.33 sq mi)
- Created: 1972
- Operator: Olympiapark München GmbH
- Status: Open year round

The Olympiapark (English: Olympic Park) in Munich, Germany, is an Olympic Park which was constructed for the 1972 Summer Olympics. Located in the Oberwiesenfeld neighborhood of Munich, the Park continues to serve as a venue for cultural, social, and religious events, such as events of worship. It includes a contemporary carillon. The Park is administered by Olympiapark München GmbH, a holding company fully owned by the state capital of Munich. The Olympic Park Munich was also considered to be an architectural marvel during the 1972 Olympics in Munich, Germany.

== Location and structure ==
Olympic Park Munich
Olympic Park Munich
1 Olympic Stadium
2 Olympic Hall
3 Theatron
4 Aquatic Center
5 Small Olympic Hall
6 Olympic Tower
7 Olympic Ice Sports Center
8 Olympic Village
9 SAP Garden
10 Olympic Mountain

The use of the term Olympiapark to designate the overall area has prevailed as a semiofficial practice, but no official name for the entire area exists.

The general area comprises four separate sub-areas:

- Olympic Area: Includes the Olympic sports facilities such as the Olympic Stadium and the Olympic Hall with Olympic Tower. Also in this area are the Aquatic Center and Olympic Event Hall.
- Olympic Village, comprising two villages, one for male and one for female athletes.
- Olympia-Pressestadt, today the home of the Olympia Shopping Center. Strictly speaking, this portion belongs to the area of the Moosach district.
- Olympic Park, adjoining the Olympic Area to the south, it includes the Olympic Hill and Olympic Lake.

The park is located in the Milbertshofen-Am Hart borough near BMW Group headquarters and the "Uptown" skyscraper of O2. Georg-Bräuchle-Ring divides the area into two halves: Olympic Village and Olympia Pressestadt to the north and Olympic Area and Olympic Park to the south.

== History ==
=== Third Reich ===
Up until 1939, Oberwiesenfeld was largely used as an airfield.

=== Post-World War II years ===
After 1945, the Oberwiesenfeld area remained fallow, and was known as a "Trümmerberg," which in German refers to a hill erected from the rubble resulting from the destruction caused by bombings during the war.

Following the war, the US Army occupied this area and had facilities at the Oberwiesefeld. In October 1957, the Army housed most of the refugees from the Hungarian Revolution in a camp at this facility.

Apart from infrastructure projects such as the Oberwiesenfeld Ice Rink, the area remained largely vacant during the post-war decades and presented an ideal site for the construction of the Olympic Stadium and complex.

=== Preparing for the 1972 Summer Olympics ===
After the International Olympic Committee awarded Munich the Olympic Games in 1966, plans were solidified for the urban redevelopment of the Oberwiesenfeld area.

The old airfield, intensely used up until 1939, lost its importance once the Munich-Riem airport was opened that year and expanded during the next three decades. As a result, Oberwiesenfeld airfield remained largely idle.

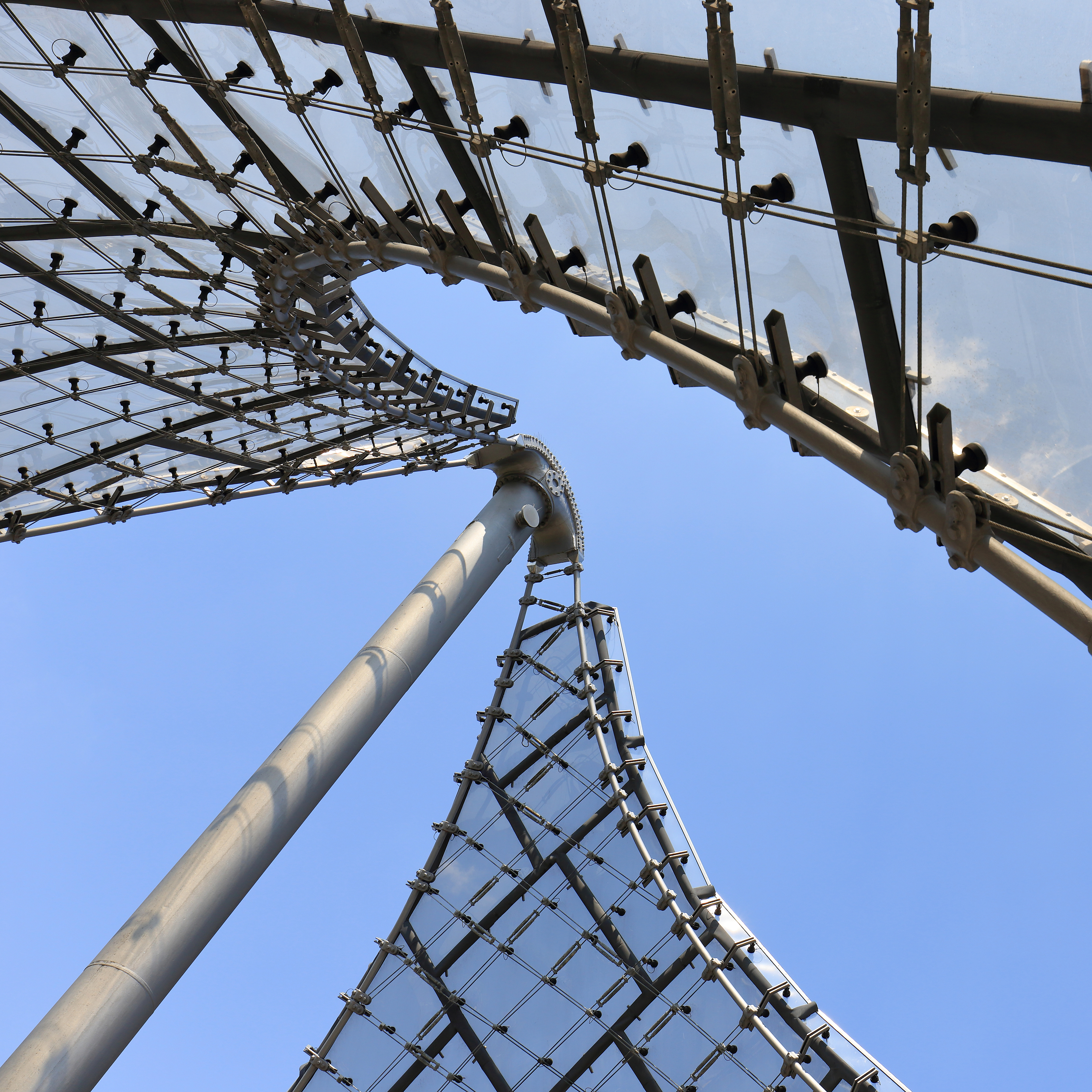
Detail of the tensile membrane roof

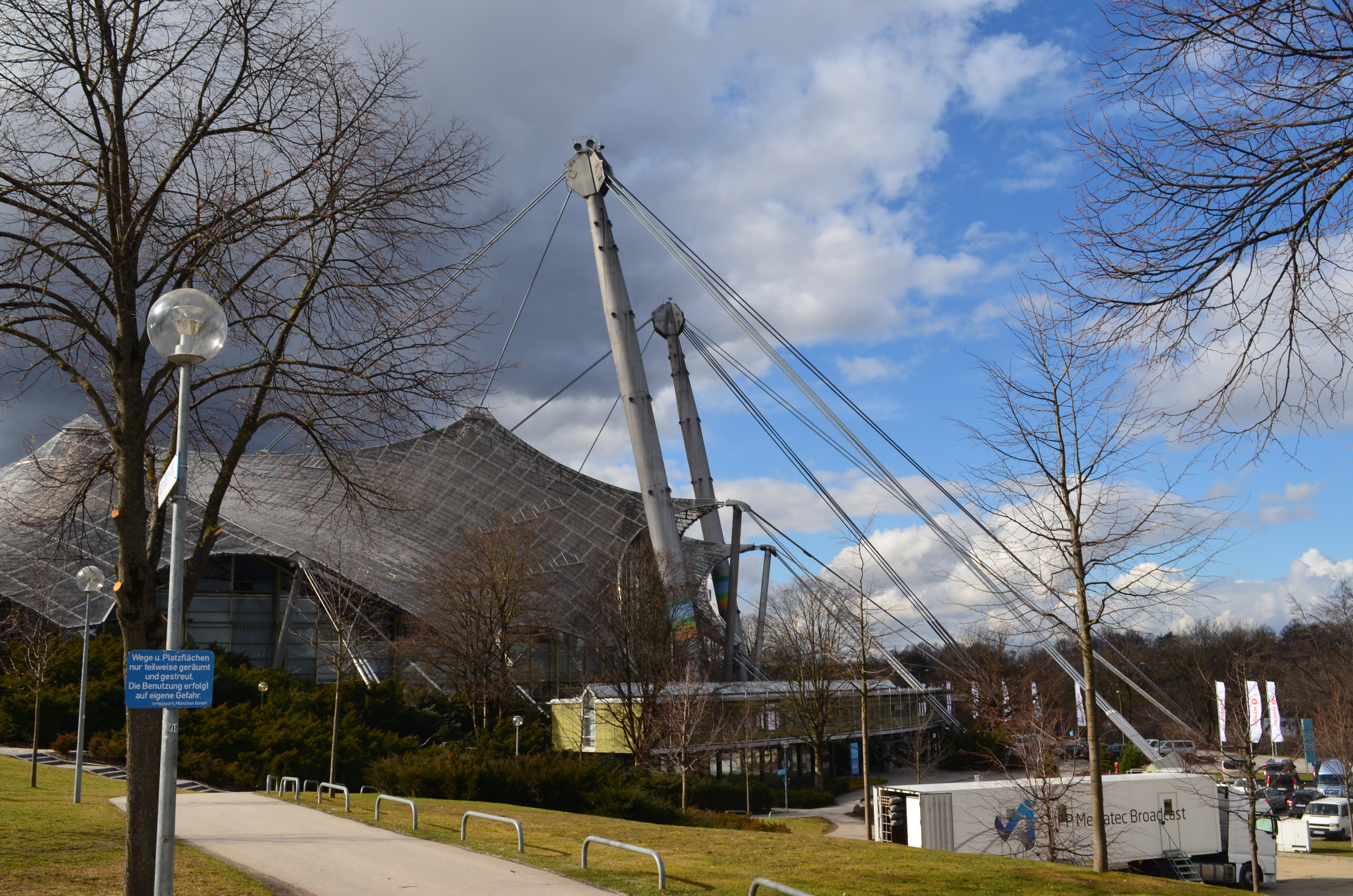
Olympia Park, Munich, Germany

Germany chose the concept of a "green Olympic Games", with an emphasis on democratic ideals. Officials sought to integrate optimism toward the future with a positive attitude toward technology, and in so doing set aside memories of the past, such as the Olympic Games of 1936 in Berlin under Hitler. The architecture firm of Günter Behnisch and its partners developed a comprehensive master plan for the sports and recreation area, which was under construction from 1968 until 1972. The landscape layout was designed by landscape architect Günther Grzimek. The eye-catching tensile structure that covers much of the park was designed by German architect and engineer Frei Otto with Günther Behnisch. In all, the project cost 1.35 billion German marks to complete.

The name "Olympiapark" was related to the city's administrative commission practice for naming metro stations along the U- and S-Bahn (subway and metropolitan railroad) routes in the city area. On 3 November 1969 it had chosen the name "Olympiapark" for the subway station at the Olympic village, set on the U3 line of the Munich U-Bahn. This naming decision was based on the idea that the name "Olympiapark" related well to the central theme of a "green Olympic Games". It also related to the central function of the U-Bahn station, which, together with the bus station, served all sports venues and important sectors of the area. The term quickly entered into quasi-official common parlance, and consequently into media use. In most situations, the meaning established by the administrative commission is used to describe the entire area, not just the U-Bahn station, as was originally intended.

== Transportation ==
Using public transportation, the Munich U-Bahn's U3 line provides a direct route: Olympiazentrum U-Bahn station on U3 line is for Olympiapark (The southern exit leads to both BMW Welt and the Olympic Park). From Münchner Freiheit (a plaza in the Munich district of Schwabing, located on Leopoldstraße), the line connects to Olympiapark via Schwabing and the midtown area. In 2007, the U3 line was extended to continue on to Oberwiesenfeld station at the northern end of the Olympic Village and Olympia-Einkaufszentrum mall at the far areas of the Park. The continuation to Moosach, where the line connects to the S1 S-Bahn line, was completed in 2010. Olympiazentrum U-Bahn station is a central stop for the MVG bus line. The southern and western portions of the Olympiapark will also be connected via Munich tram lines 12, 20, 21, and 27. As these areas are remote from the northern part of Olympiapark, they are primarily of interest for the annual Tollwood music festival held there each summer.

After the 1972 Olympic Games, the Olympiastadion Station was disconnected from regular networks. It was used for some events, but the station was closed in 1988 and the tracks taken up in 2003. It has been abandoned and continues to decay.

The Olympiapark is accessible by car via Mittlerer Ring motorway. The Olympic Village is closed off from car traffic.

== Olympic Area in detail ==
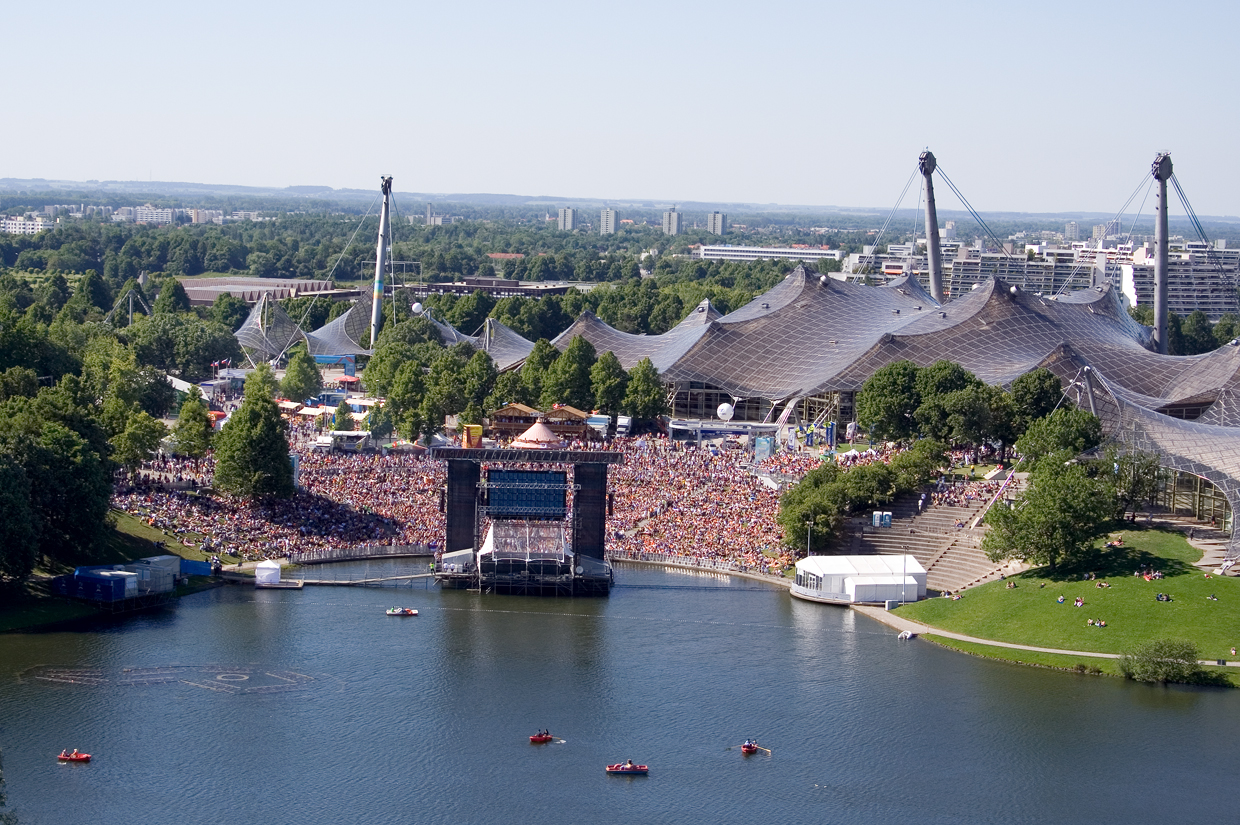
Public viewing during FIFA World Cup 2006

The Olympic Area lies south of Georg-Brauchle-Ring and north of the Olympiasee lake; it is the smallest portion of the entire Olympiapark area. It comprises the following competition sites:

=== Olympic Stadium ===
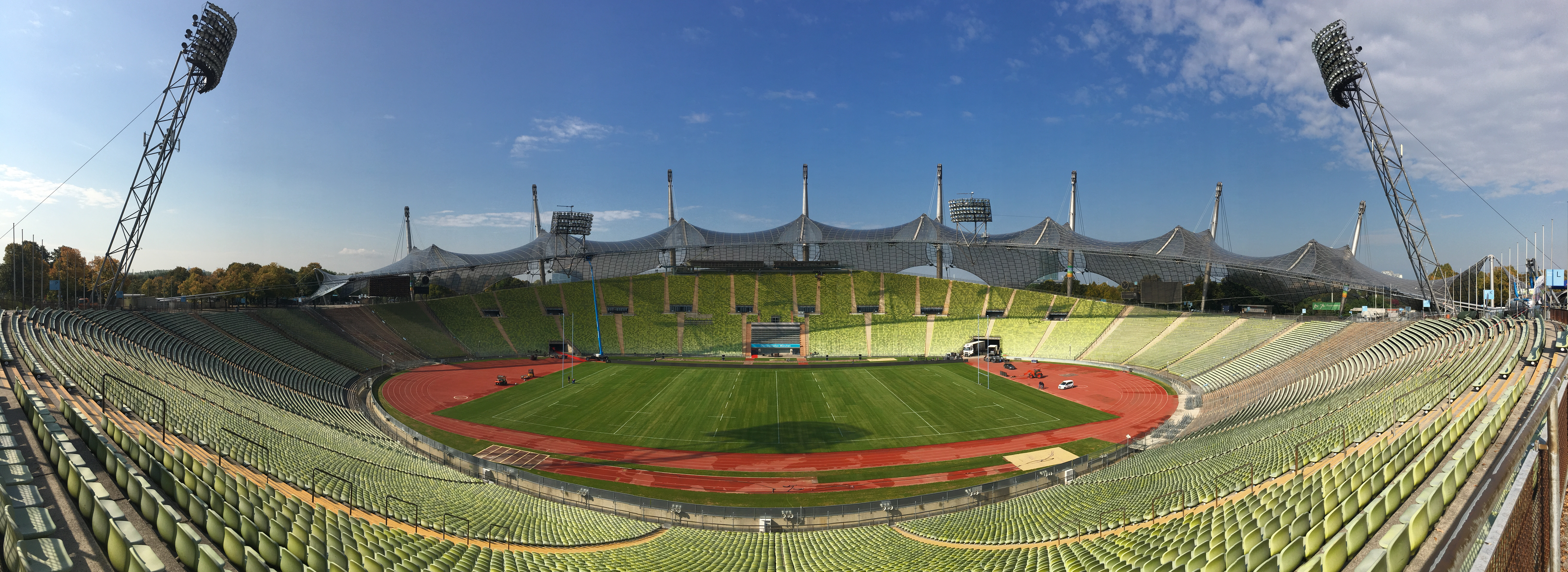
Olympic Stadium, Munich, Germany

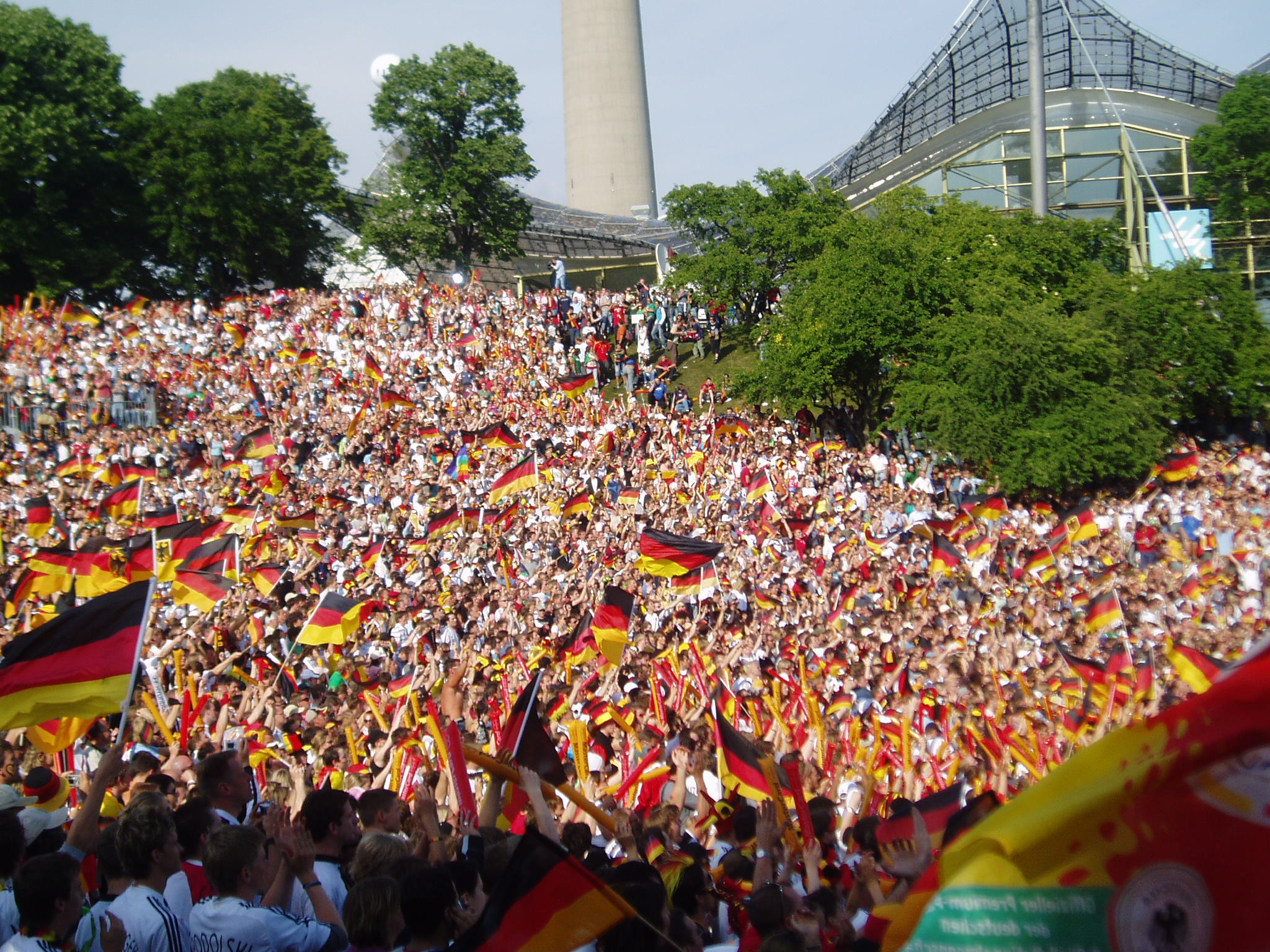
Supporters assisting at the opening match of the finals tournament of 2006 FIFA World Cup

The central stadium, constructed from 1968 to 1972, was designed by the architecture firm of Behnisch and Partners. It is currently home to the highest number of staged national and international competitions in Germany. Originally constructed to hold almost 71,000 spectators during the Olympics, and thereafter 73,000 for football matches, this number was reduced at the end of the 1990s to 69,000 due to security concerns; currently it is just above 63,000. After the Olympic Games, the Stadium was used primarily for football matches and served as the home stadium for the football teams FC Bayern München and TSV 1860 München. Since the opening of the Allianz Arena in 2005, the site is used almost exclusively for cultural events. During some concerts in this stadium, people have been known to sit on the Olympiapark hill, to listen for free.

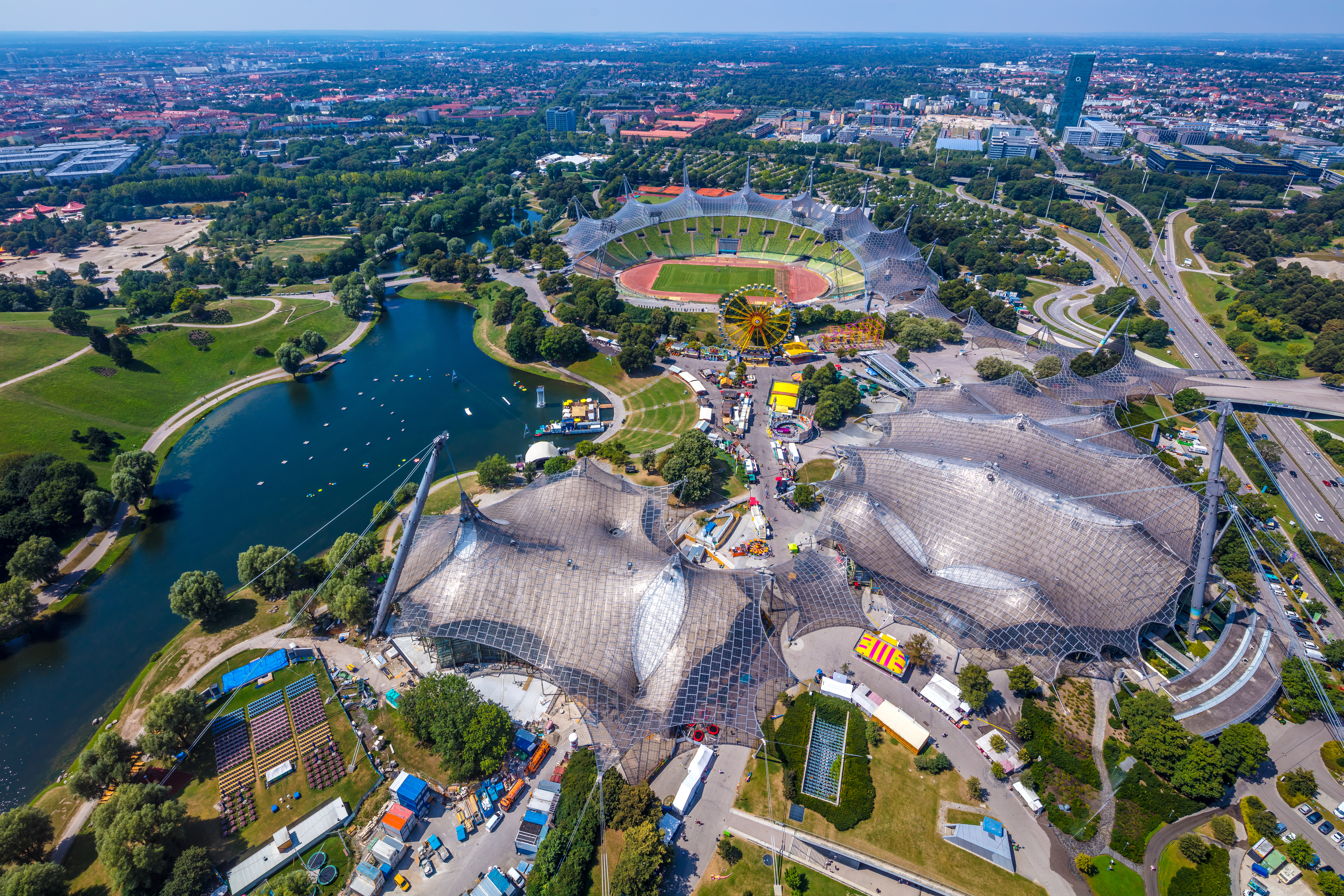
Partial view of The Olympiapark (a view down of the Olympiaturm to the Olympic Stadium, on the right: Olympia Halle, left: Schwimmhalle)

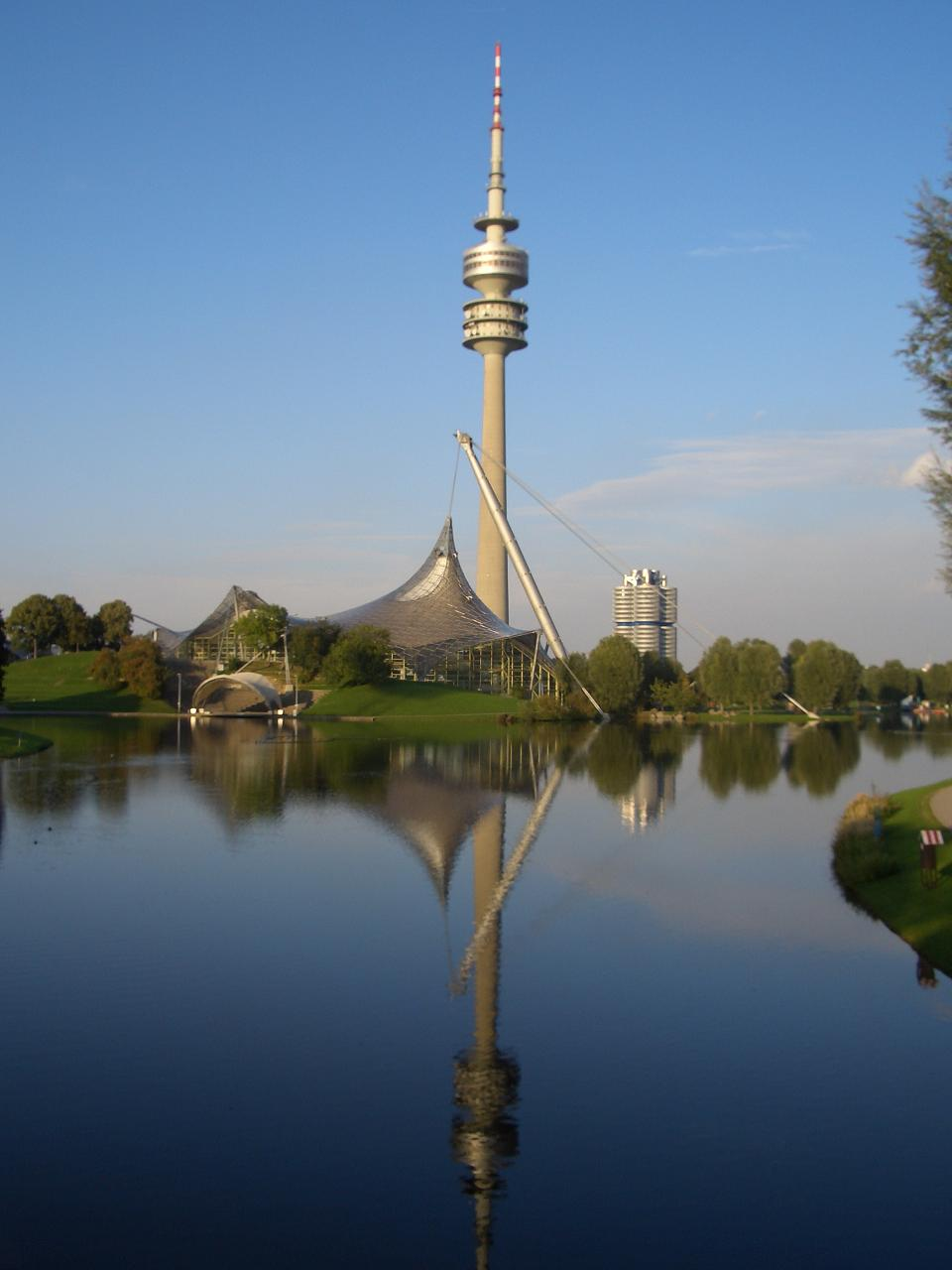
General view of the Aquatic Center, park, pond and communication tower (Olympiaturm)

=== Olympic Hall ===
Also designed by the architecture firm of Behnisch and Partners, Olympic Hall is a sport and recreational facility located northeast of the Olympic Stadium. Its capacity is 12,597 with seats, or some 15,300 including standing areas.

=== Small Olympic Hall ===
The Small Olympic Hall (Kleine Olympiahalle) was opened in 2011 as an underground facility built beneath the park's green landscape to preserve the visual integrity of the original historical structures. Designed by the architectural firm Auer+Weber, it has a total multifunctional capacity of up to 4,000 visitors and is directly connected to the main Olympic Hall via an underground tunnel. New curved concrete arches serve as the entrance path leading down to the subterranean venue.

=== Aquatic Center ===
Architecturally, the venue shares the same historic tensile canopy roof design engineered by Behnisch & Partner and Frei Otto. Managed today by Stadtwerke München (SWM) as part of their M-Bäder municipal network, the venue remains open for public recreational swimming and professional training. It features a 50-meter competition sports pool, a dedicated diving pool with a 10-meter platform, saunas, and a fitness center.

One notable feature of the Munich Schwimmhalle is the way in which the cobbled paths leading to the venue continue under the canopy as far as the top of the seating area, thus creating the genuine impression of walking in off the street to one's seat. The venue is available both to swimming teams and also to the public.

=== Olympic Ice Sports Center ===
The Olympic Icestadion was built from April 1965 by the plans of Rolf Schütze and opened on 12 February 1967 with the ice hockey game between FC Bayern Munich and SC Riessersee. After using it for the 1969 World Table Tennis Championships, the Icestadion was used for the Olympic Summer games 1972 for boxing. The stadium has a capacity for 6,142 visitors and is used for the games of the team of EHC Red Bull München at the Deutsche Eishockey Liga.

On the left site of the Icestadion stands an open-air ice-skating rink. In 1980 it was decided to build a roof over the open-air rink in order to have it operational during the whole year independent of the weather conditions. The German architectural firm Ackermann und Partner designed an elegant light-weight tensile structure spanning 100 meters length-wise. The building was completed in 1983. In 2004 the ice-skating rink was closed and is now used to play indoor soccer.

On the right side of the Icestadion 1991 the new training hall for the Icesport world championship was built over the parking area after the plans of Kurt Ackermann.

=== Velodrome ===
The Radstadion was an outdoor track cycling velodrome with a capacity of 5,000 spectators constructed for the 1972 Summer Olympics. Following decades of multi-purpose use, the original velodrome structure was completely demolished in 2015 to clear space for modern urban development. A new state-of-the-art sports complex named SAP Garden was constructed on the site, opening as a multifunctional indoor arena with a capacity of up to 12,500 seats designed by Danish architectural firm 3XN. It serves as the official home stadium for the EHC Red Bull München ice hockey team and FC Bayern Munich basketball club.

=== Olympic Tower ===
The Olympiaturm has an overall height of 291 m and a weight of 52,500 tonnes. At a height of 190 m there is an observation platform as well as a small rock and roll museum housing various memorabilia. Since its opening in 1968 the tower has registered over 35 million visitors (as of 2004). At a height of 182 m there is a revolving restaurant that seats 230 people. A full revolution takes 53 minutes. The tower has one Deutsche Telekom maintenance elevator with a speed of 4 m/s, as well as two visitor lifts with a speed of 7 m/s which have a capacity of about 30 people per cabin. The travel time from the ground to the viewing platform is about 30 seconds.

=== East-West Peace Church ===
The East-West Peace Church, which Munich's former mayor Christian Ude described as "Munich's most charming black building," dates back to pre-Olympic times. The Russian hermit Timofej Wassiljewitsch Prochorow built the church in 1952, along with his wife, without a building permit, from remains of a nearby rubble mountain. Upon completion, Timofej offered his church building to both the Catholic Church and the Russian Orthodox Church in Munich as a place of worship. However, those in charge of each rejected the offer, as the Catholics saw too many elements of the Orthodox in the building, and the Orthodox in turn saw too many Catholic elements. As a result, Timofey himself celebrated the liturgy. The East-West Peace Church was completely destroyed by fire on June 11, 2023. According to BR24, the former mayor of Munich, Christian Ude, publicly advocated the reconstruction of the East-West Peace Church as a symbol of hope for peace.

=== Olympic Village ===
This was the site of the Munich massacre in the second week of the Games, when eleven of the Israeli team and a West German policeman were murdered by Black September Palestinian terrorists.

- Olympic Village
- Student District

=== Olympia Pressestadt ===
The Olympia Pressestadt lies west of the Olympiapark between Landshuter Allee in the east and Riesstraße in the west. During the 1972 Summer Olympics, the area served as the official Media Centre (Pressezentrum), accommodating thousands of international journalists reporting on the event. Following the conclusion of the Games, the entire residential complex was successfully repurposed alongside the nearby Olympic Village into public student housing, condominiums, and apartment rentals integrated into Munich's urban network.

==== Carillon ====
The carillon, built in 1972, was one of five carillons in Bavaria. Rather than occupying a traditional bell tower, it was set on an open framework with the bells exposed to view. It was built for the 1972 Summer Olympics on Coubertinplatz, the central square in the Olympic Park. It was made by the Dutch bell foundry Royal Eijsbouts and has a range of 50 bells (originally 49 bells, 1991 retrofit a Cis bell).

In 2007, the Olympic Carillon was dismantled due to restructuring measures in the Olympic Park. It was reinstalled in 2012, with American carillonneur Jim Saenger "ringing in" the rebuilt carillon with a concert on April 16, 2012.

==== Munich Olympic Walk Of Stars ====
In 2003 the Munich Olympic Walk of Stars was constructed as a path from the Olympic Lake, als Weg am Olympiasee, in the style of the Hollywood Walk of Fame. Celebrities leave their hand- and footprints behind in the concrete. Singer Howard Carpendale was the first to do so, and since then roughly 30 personalities from culture and sport have left impressions of themselves behind.

== Regular events (apart from concerts) ==
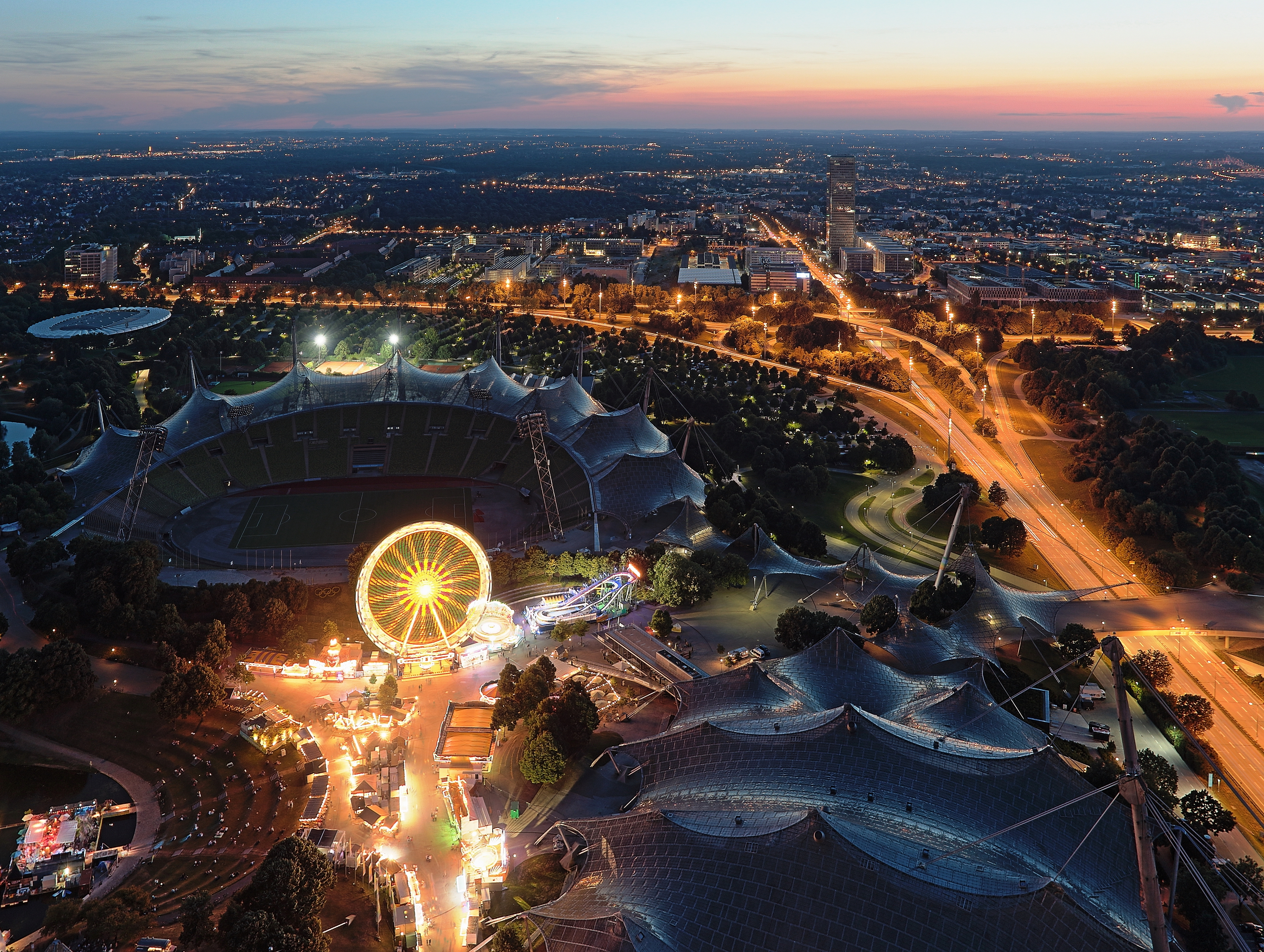
Summer Festival

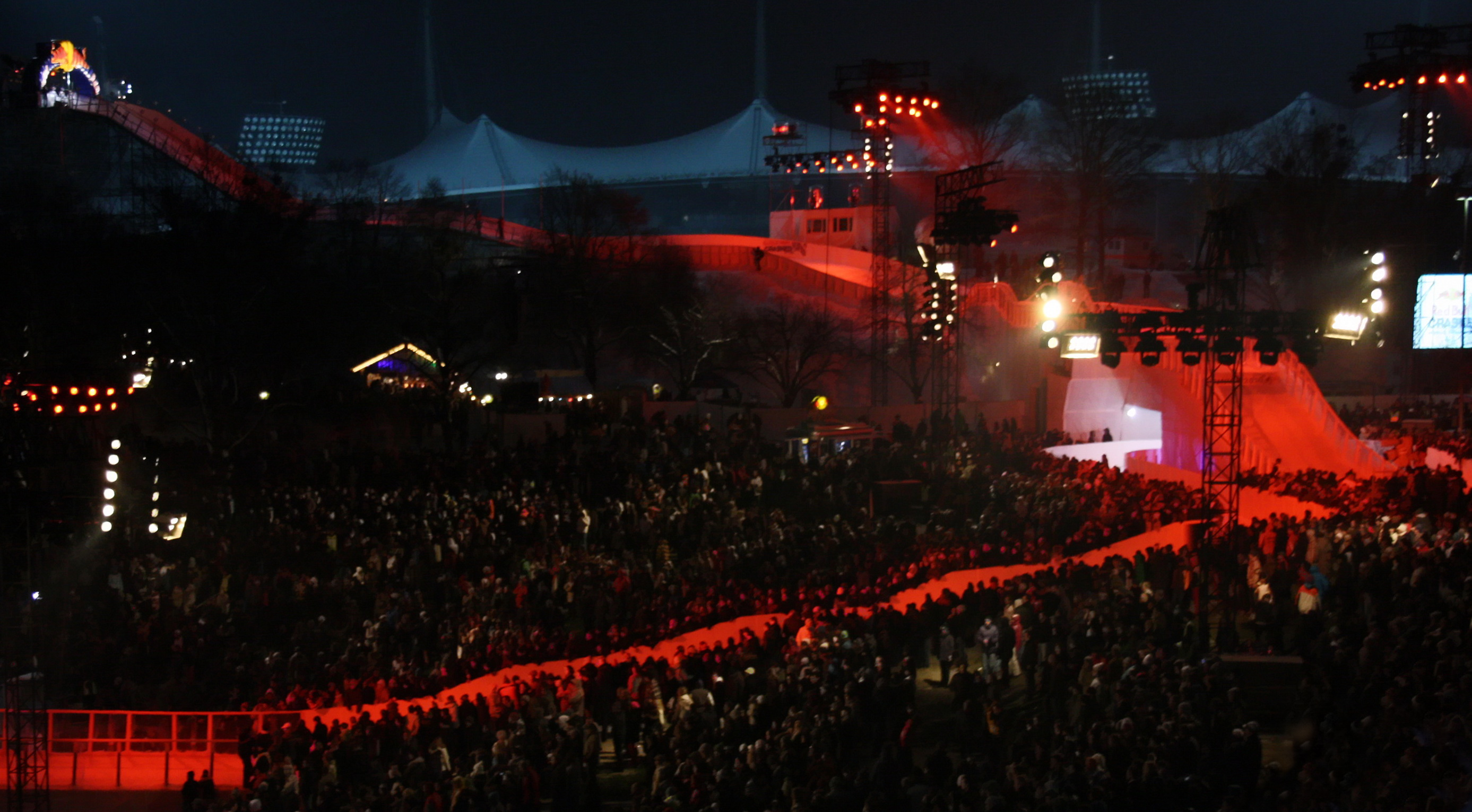
Red Bull Crashed Ice 2010

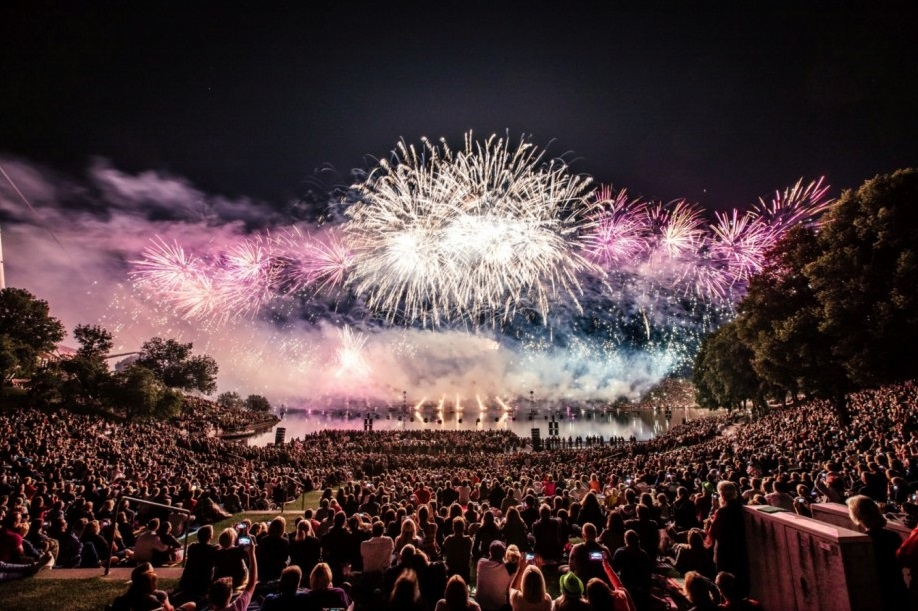
Musikfireworks show at the Münchner Sommernachtstraum 2018

The Olympiapark host a number of regular events on a yearly basisː

=== Olympic Hall ===
- Six-Day-Run (since 1972)
- Munich Indoors (since 1998)
- Supercross-Cup (since 1999)
- Holiday on Ice (since 1975)
- Night of the Proms (since 1995)
- International Exhibition (since 1972)
- Watchtower-Congress of the Jehovah's Witnesses (since 1973)

=== Olympic Swim Hall ===
- 24-Hour-Swim (since 2000)
- Munich Triathlon (since 2003, always at the end of May)

=== Open-Air Theatron ===
- Summer Music Theatron (since 1972)
- Open-Air Pentecost Theatron (since 2001)

=== Others ===
- Spartan Race Sprint
- Tollwood Festival (summer music festival)
- Summerfest in Olympiapark
- Münchner Sommernachtstraum

== Public establishments ==
=== Education and learning ===
- Elementary school on Nadistrasse (known as "Nadischule")
- Zentrale Hochschulsportanlage, joint central sports facility of Munich's universities and colleges.
- Department of Sport and Health Sciences at Technical University of Munich.
- Olympiastützpunkt Bayern

=== Health ===
- Outpatient department for sport orthopedics at TU Munich's Rechts der Isar teaching hospital.

=== Sport ===
- Olympic staging post of Bavaria

=== Memorials ===
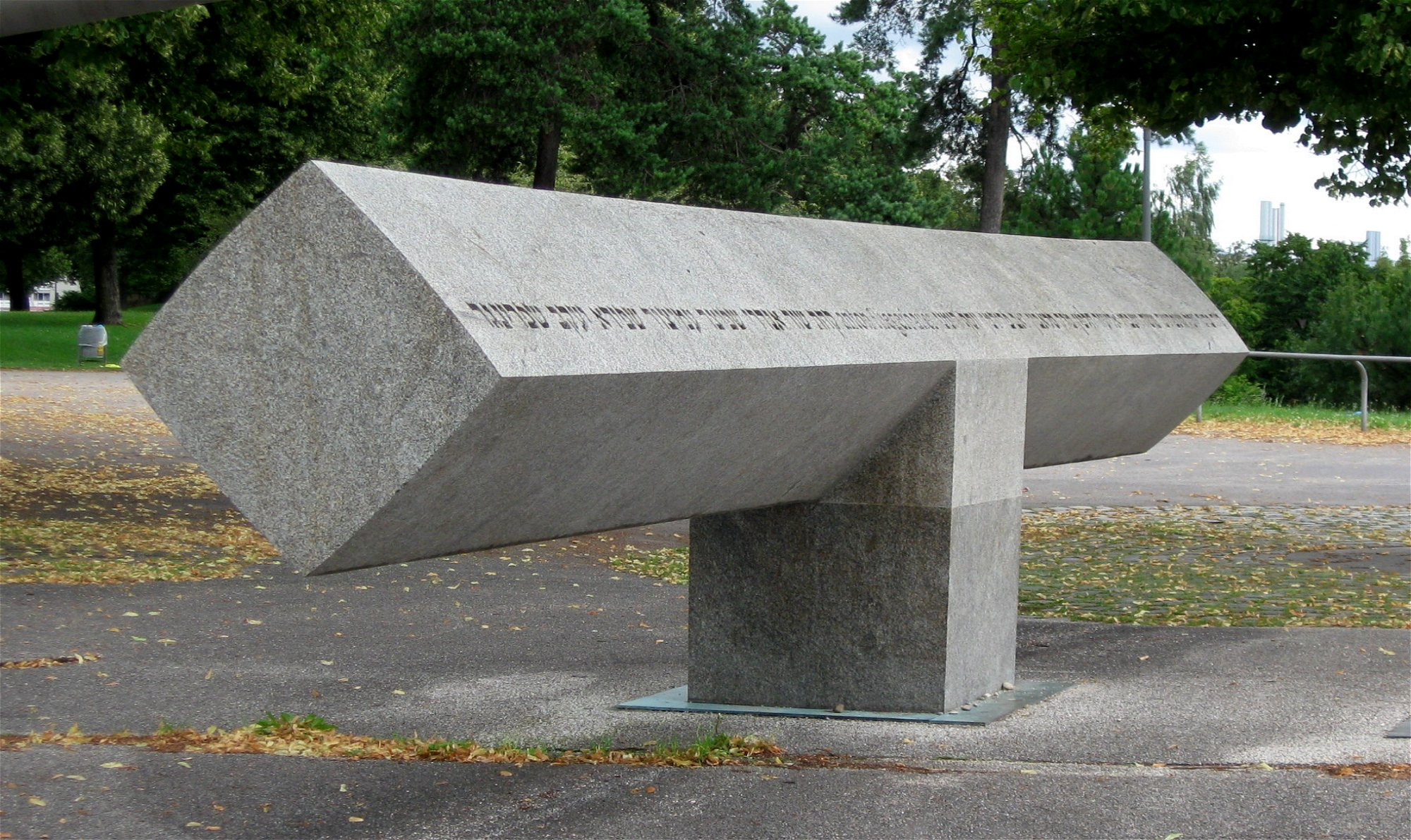
Memorial for the victims of the massacre at the Olympic Games in Munich in 1972 (1995)

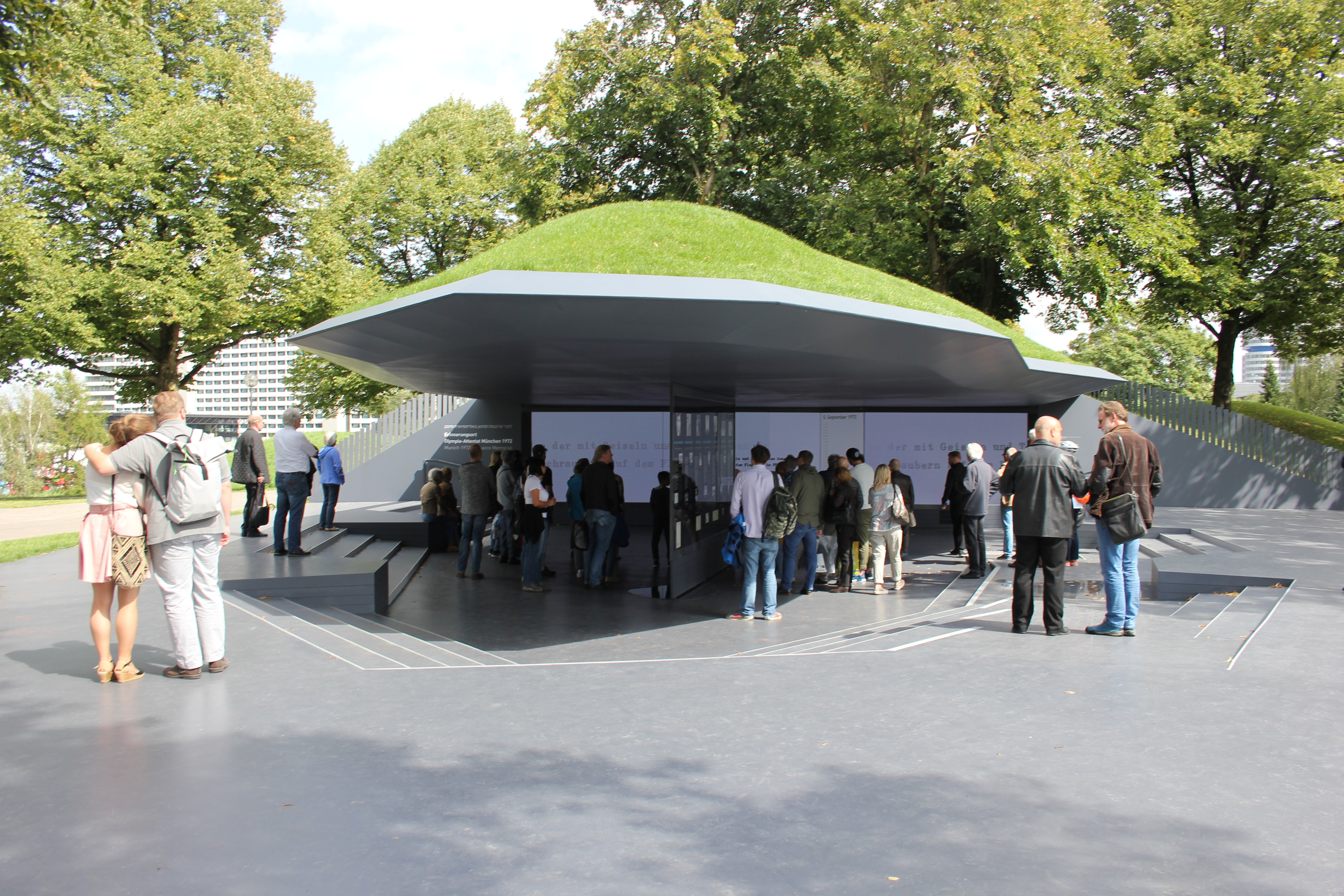
Erinnerungsort Olympia-Attentat

- Memorial for the civilian victims of the Second World War (Olympiaberg)
- Memorial plaque for the victims of the attack on the Israeli Olympic team of 1972
- Erinnerungsort Olympia-Attentat

== See also ==
- Tensile and membrane structures
- Zentrale Hochschulsportanlage
