= Planyavsky =

Planyavsky is an Austrian surname. Notable people with the surname include:

- Alfred Planyavsky (1924–2013), Austrian double-bassist and music historian
- Peter Planyavsky (born 1947), Austrian organist and composer
