= Landshuter Allee =

Avenue in Munich, Germany

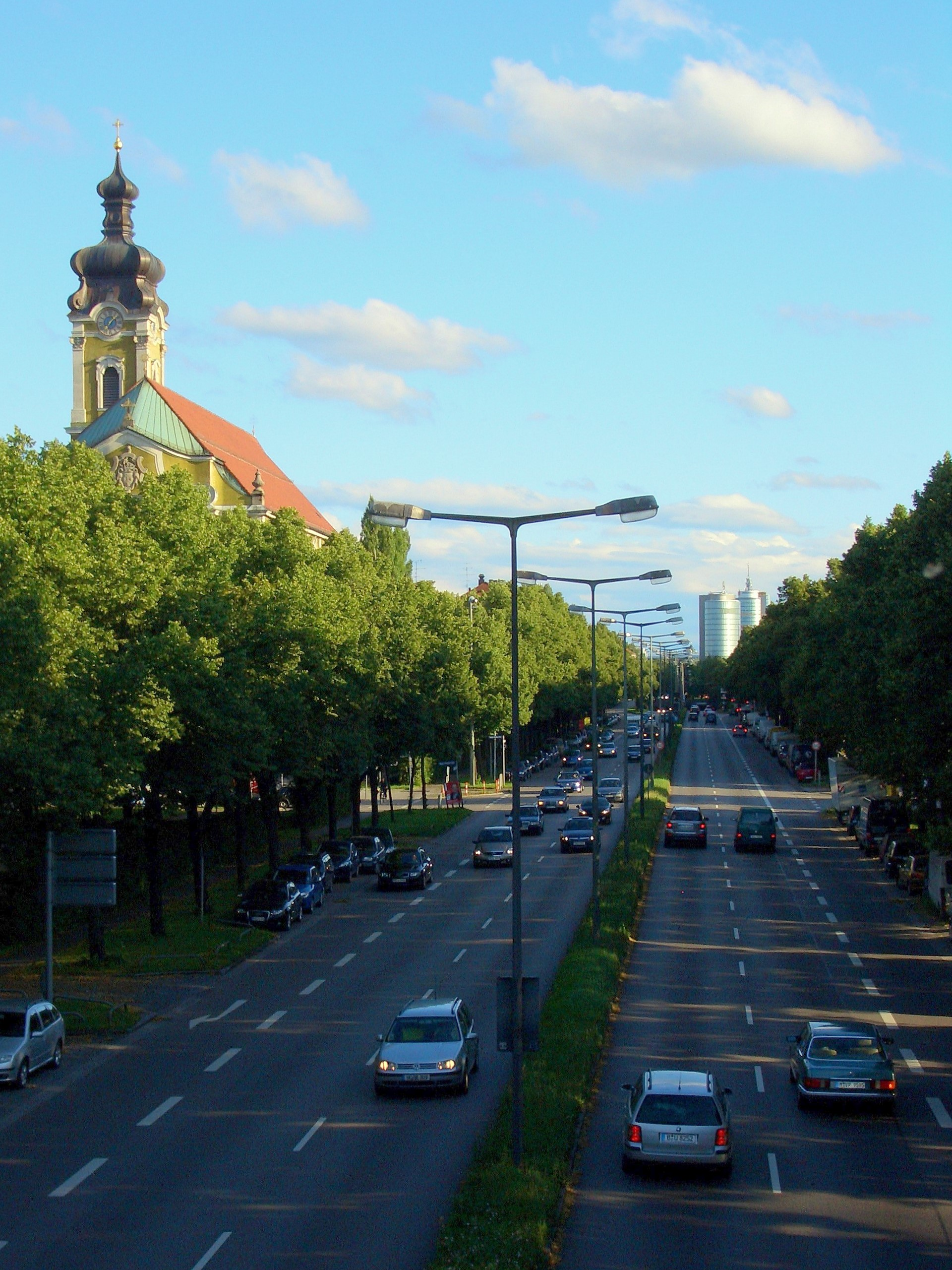
View to the south. Left: St. Theresia; in the back: Central Tower Munich

The Landshuter Allee is an avenue in Munich and through most of its course it is part of the Mittlerer Ring, the Bundesstraße 2 R. It joins Donnersbergerbrücke at Arnulfstraße in the Neuhausen district and runs from Dachauer Straße west of the Olympiapark to Moosacher Straße west of the Olympic village in the Moosach district. The B 2R leaves the intersection-free avenue at the Landshuter Allee and continues on the Georg-Brauchle-Ring. The Landshuter Allee now functions as the B 304 and connects the Mittlerer Ring with the northern tangent of the Outer Ring, which is only partially complete. The large width of the Landshuter Allee of 54 metres between the houses is striking. It crosses the Nymphenburg-Biedersteiner Kanal.

== History ==
From 1858 to 1892 the single-track railway line from Munich to Landshut ran on today's Landshuter Allee. At that time the Landshuter Allee was called Fabrikstraße, named after the locomotive factory Krauss and from 1902 Landshuter Allee. In 1917 during the First World War it was renamed Hindenburgstraße after the Field Marshal Paul von Hindenburg. After the Second World War the street got its old name back. After the surrender of the Wehrmacht Munich belonged to the American occupation zone and the US army demanded "that all squares and streets reminding of persons of the Drittes Reich and militarism since 1914 should be renamed". It bordered the Moosach gas works in the east and in 1972 the Olympic press city lay to the west of it.

== Buildings ==
Landshuter Allee has many exit and entrance ramps. Furthermore, it is tunnelled underneath the Platz der Freiheit at a length of about 430 meters. The crossing with the Georg-Brauchle-Ring must also be observed from the traffic point of view. Worth mentioning is the Danner-Forum, an office building built in 2000 with house number 12-14 behind a multi-storey glass curtain. The Maxim cinema is located at Landshuter Allee 33. The Borstei is located between Landshuter Allee and Dachauer Straße, on the other side of the street was the Olympia-Radstadion (Bike Stadium) until its demolition in 2015. To the north of the Georg-Brauchle-Ring lies the former Munich Olympic Stadium railway station.

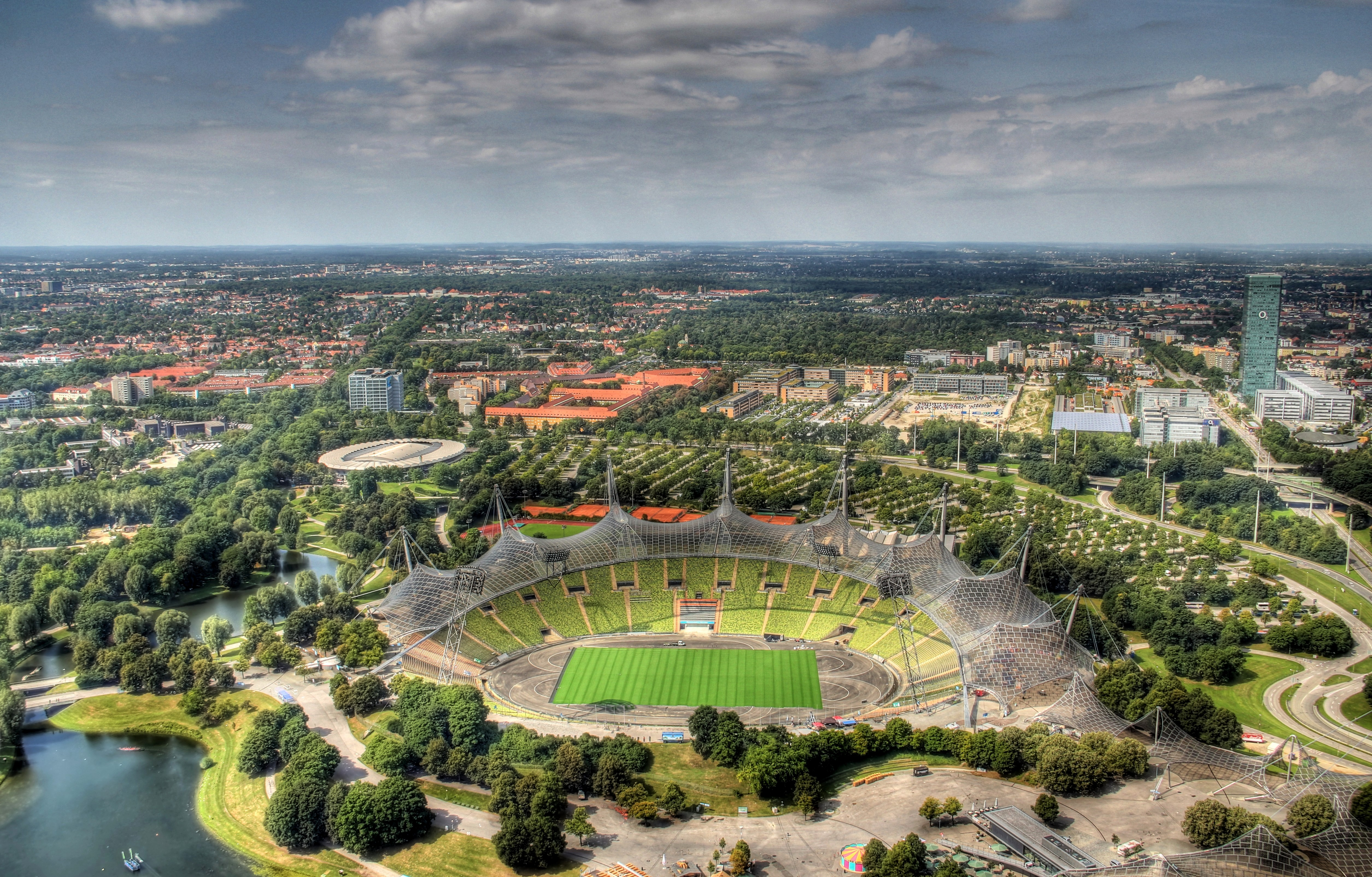
Landshuter Allee between Borstei and the Olympia-Radstadion in the Olympic Park

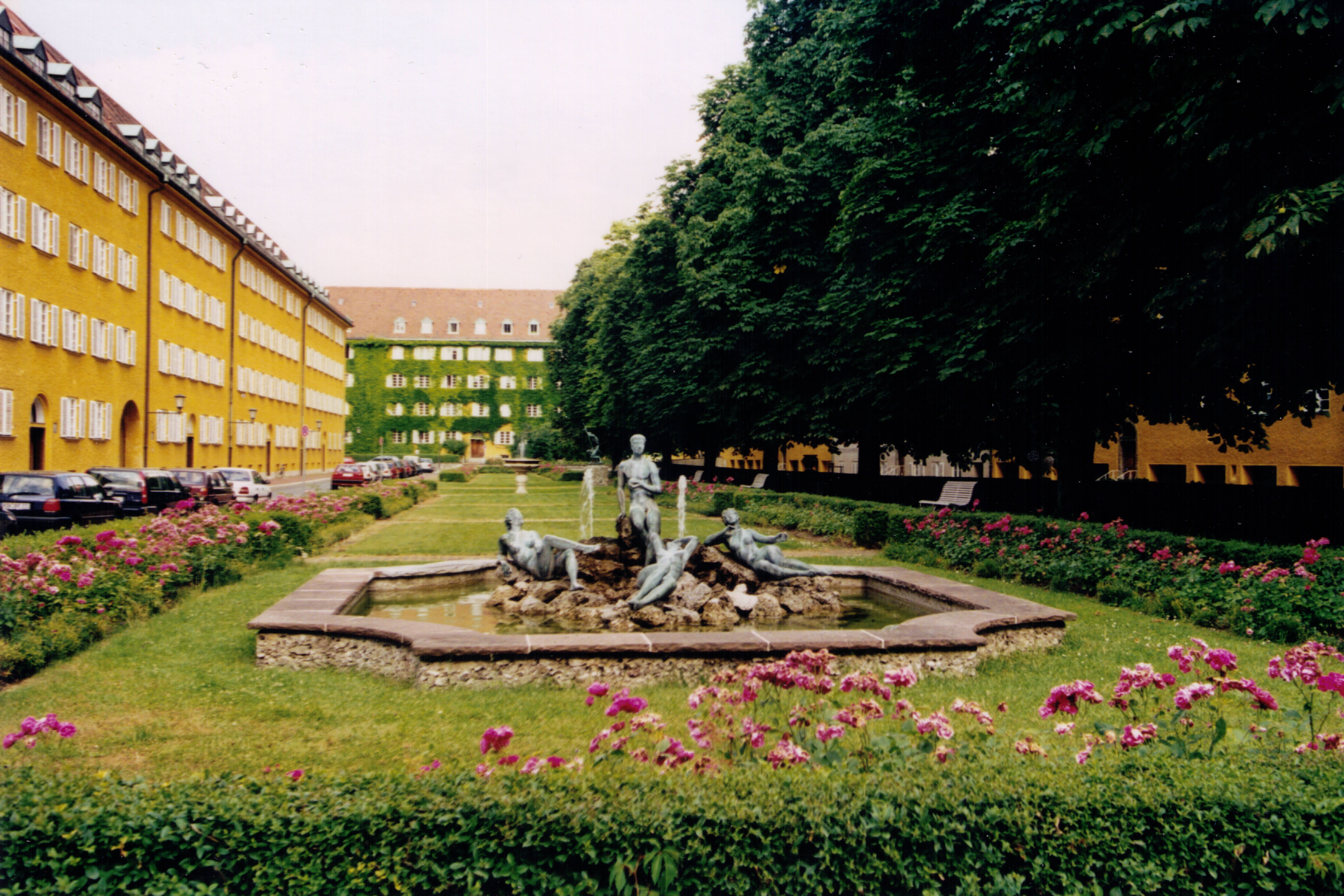
Borstei

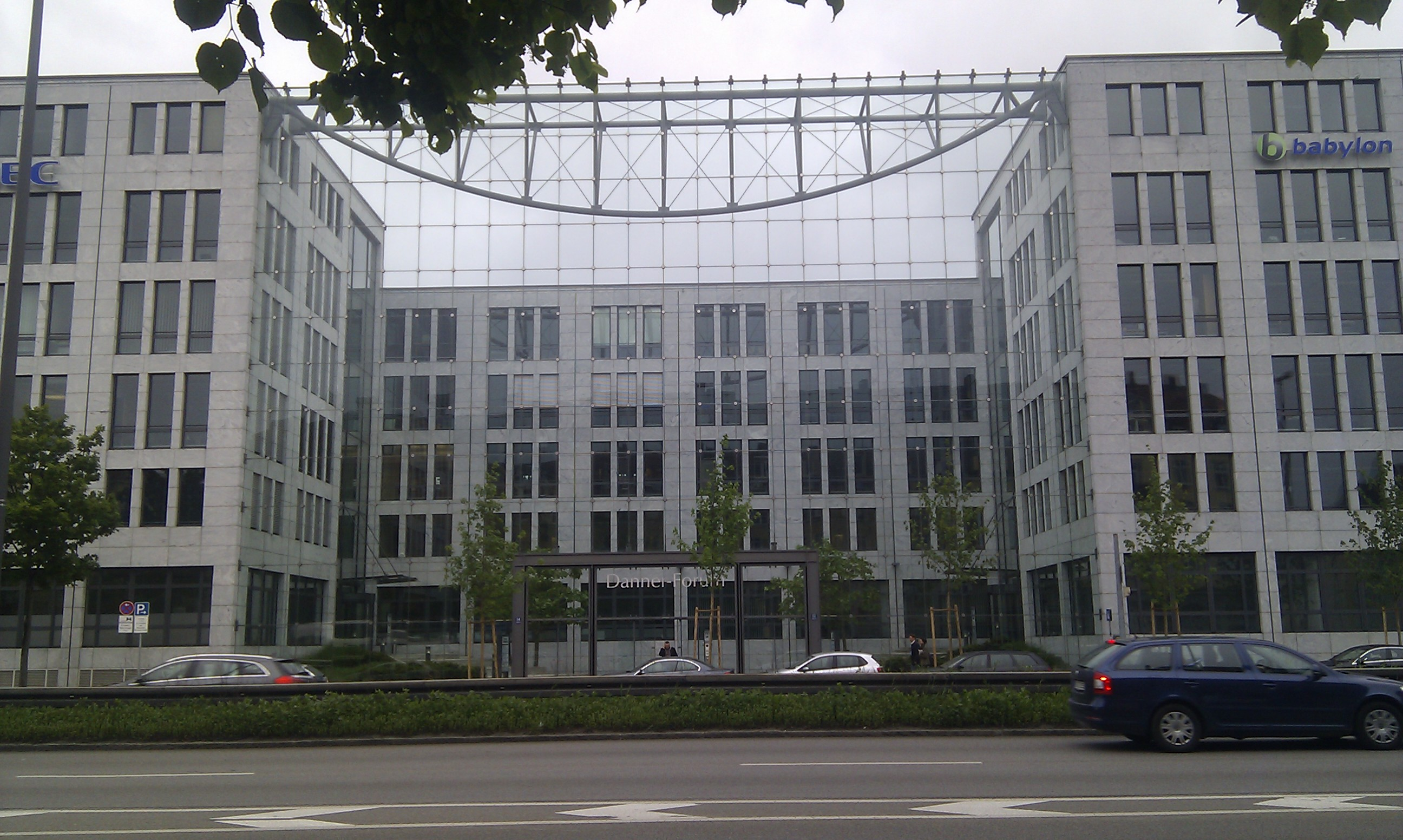
Danner-Forum

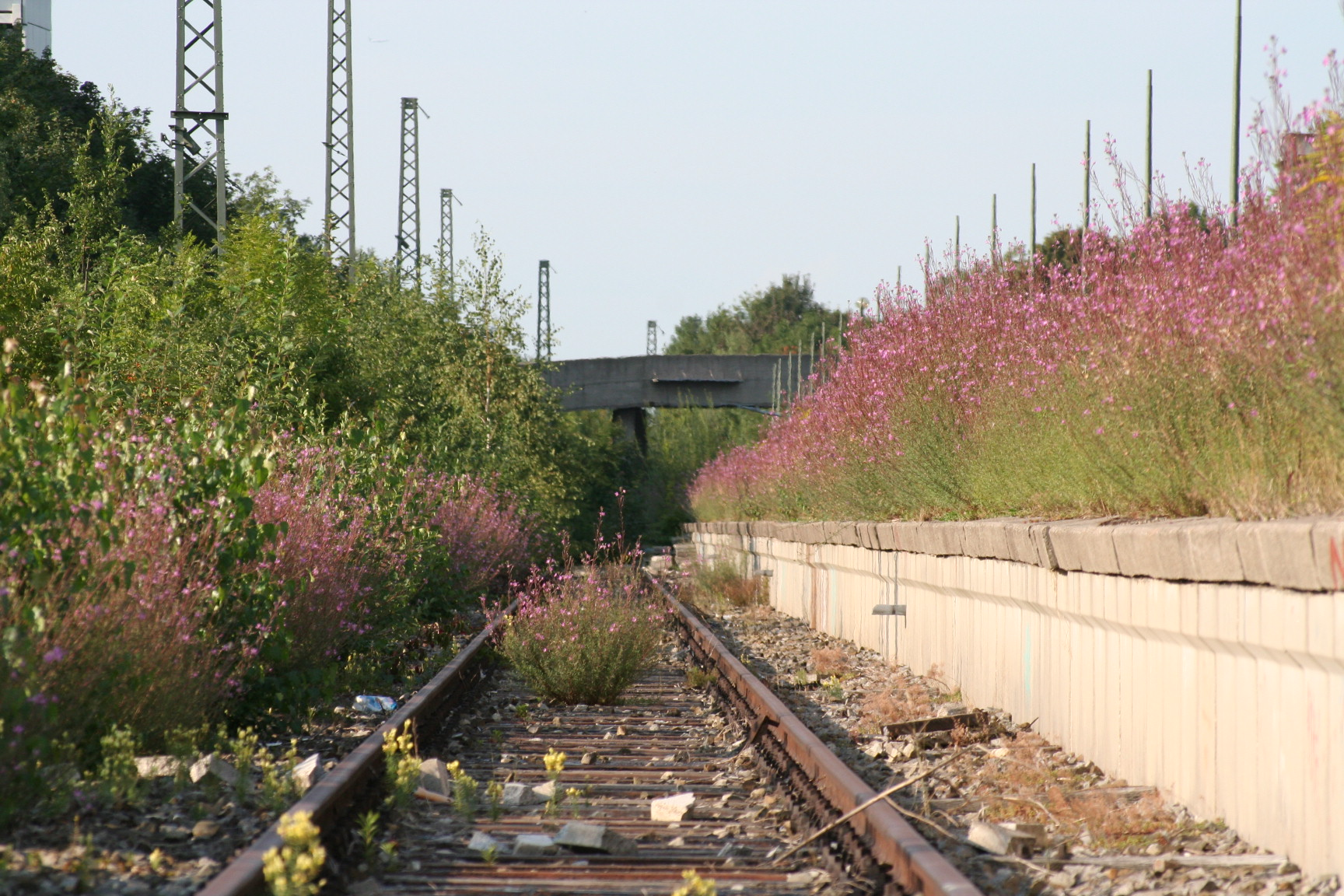
Former train station Munich Olympic Stadium

== Importance for Munich traffic ==
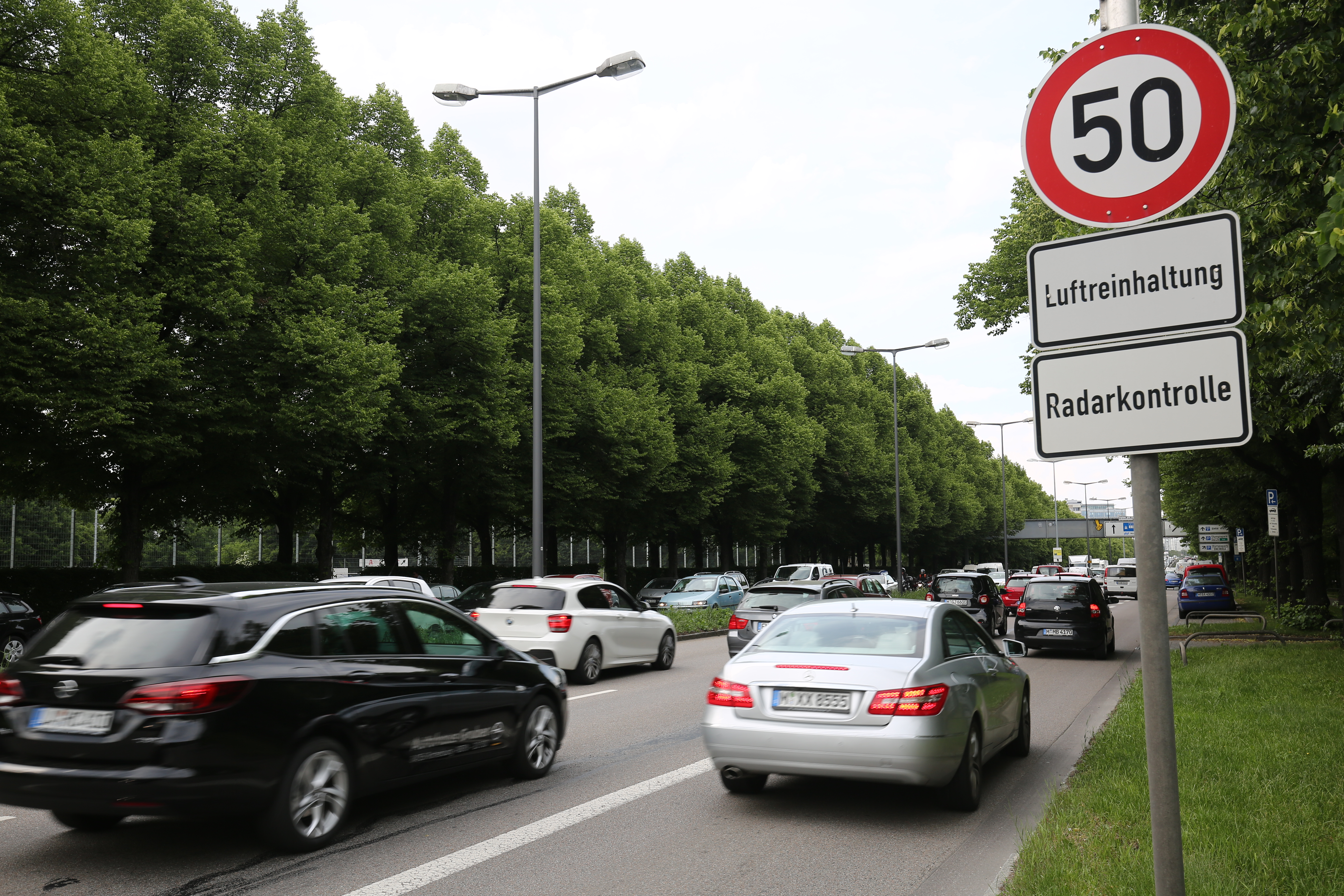
Speed limit for air pollution control

Since the Mittlerer Ring is perhaps the most important traffic artery in Munich, its importance for traffic circulation is also very high. This is why congestion often occurs along the route.

Two bus lines lead to the Platz der Freiheit via the Landshuter Allee; in the immediate vicinity of this square is also the underground station Rotkreuzplatz at the square of the same name, which is served by the underground U1.

For environmental reasons, a speed limit of 50 km/h has been in force on Landshuter Allee since the summer 2015.

== Measuring station for environmental monitoring ==
The Umweltbundesamt (Federal Environment Agency) operates a measuring station for environmental monitoring on Landshuter Allee.

It became known by the fact that for the first time in Germany, the EU limit value for fine dust particles were exceeded. Since the limit value for PM-10 particles came into force on 1 January 2005, more than 35 days with values greater than 50 μg/m^{3} have been measured at this station every year.

Dieter Janecek, chairman of the Bavarian state association of Bündnis 90/Die Grünen since 2008, sued the state capital of Munich in 2007 as a resident of the Landshuter Allee before the Federal Administrative Court because of these exceedances. As a result, Munich introduced a Low-emission zone on 1 October 2008.

This station also exceeds the limit values for nitrogen oxides. In 2009 there were a total of 95 days with more than 200 μg/m^{3} NO_{2}, 59 with more than 210 μg/m^{3} and an annual average value of 92 μg/m^{3}. Therefore, this measuring station took first place in all three categories in Germany. The limit values provide for 18 days with exceedances and an annual average value of less than 46 μg/m^{3}.

== Tunnel underneath and Olympic Park extension ==
A tunnel under the Landshuter Allee is being planned. Up to 1100 apartments could be built above ground. In 2012, the Department of Urban Planning and Building Regulations of the City of Munich commissioned a feasibility study. Over the aisle at the former Munich Olympic Stadium train station, a high line-like park connection with a cycle path in the direction of Dreiseenplatte is in planning.

== K11 - Commissioners in action ==
From 2003 to 2012, the television series K11 - Kommissare im Einsatz (Sat.1) was filmed on the second floor of Landshuter Allee 8, where the section in front of the house could be seen over and over again.
