= Oskar Gottlieb Blarr =

German composer, organist, church musician and academic teacher

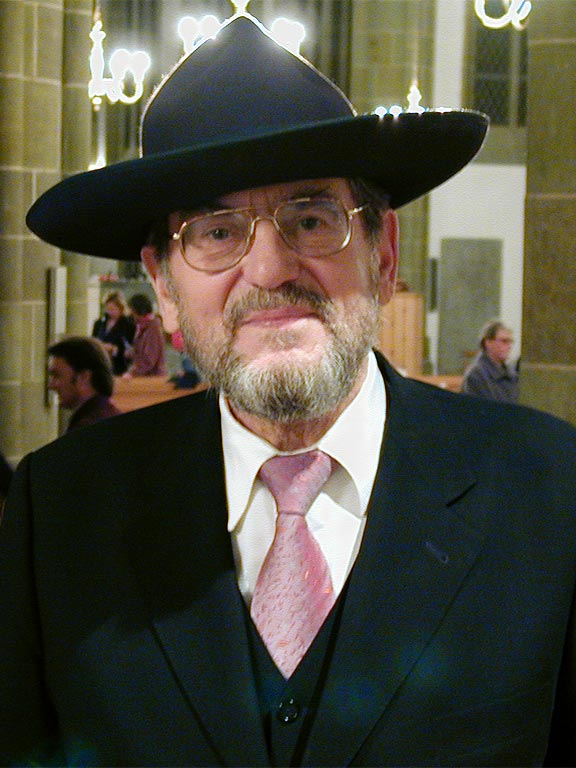
- Blarr in 2001
- Born: 6 May 1934 (age 90); Sandlack, Germany
- Occupations: Church musician; Composer; Classical organist; Academic teacher
- Organizations: Neanderkirche; Robert-Schumann-Hochschule
- Website: blarr.info

Oskar Gottlieb Blarr (born 6 May 1934) is a German composer, organist, church musician and academic teacher.

== Career ==
Blarr was born in Sandlack near Bartenstein (East Prussia). The Gothic church with its Baroque organ fascinated him early on; he began to form a lifelong love for organs. Blarr and his family fled to West Germany in 1945. He wrote his first compositions at the age of 12. He studied church music from 1952 at the Kirchenmusikschule in Hannover, percussion at the Musikhochschule Hannover, and composition with Heinrich Spitta. He continued his studies, conducting with Dean Dixon and Herbert von Karajan in Salzburg, composition with Bernd Alois Zimmermann in Cologne, Krzysztof Penderecki at the Folkwang-Hochschule in Essen, and Milko Kelemen and Günther Becker at the Robert Schumann Hochschule. He was the church musician of the Neanderkirche in Düsseldorf from 1961 to 1999. He also lectured there at both the Katechetisches Seminar and the Robert Schumann Hochschule from 1984.

Blarr composed four oratorios about the life of Jesus, four symphonies, chamber music and works for organ. He also set many songs of the genre Neues Geistliches Lied to music, some of under the pseudonym Choral Brother Ogo. His organ works were recorded with organists Wolfgang Abendroth and Martin Schmeding. He was a member of the ecumenical Textautoren- und Komponistengruppe der Werkgemeinschaft Musik e.V. and the association Musik in der Ev. Jugend (now: Textautoren- und Komponistengruppe TAKT.

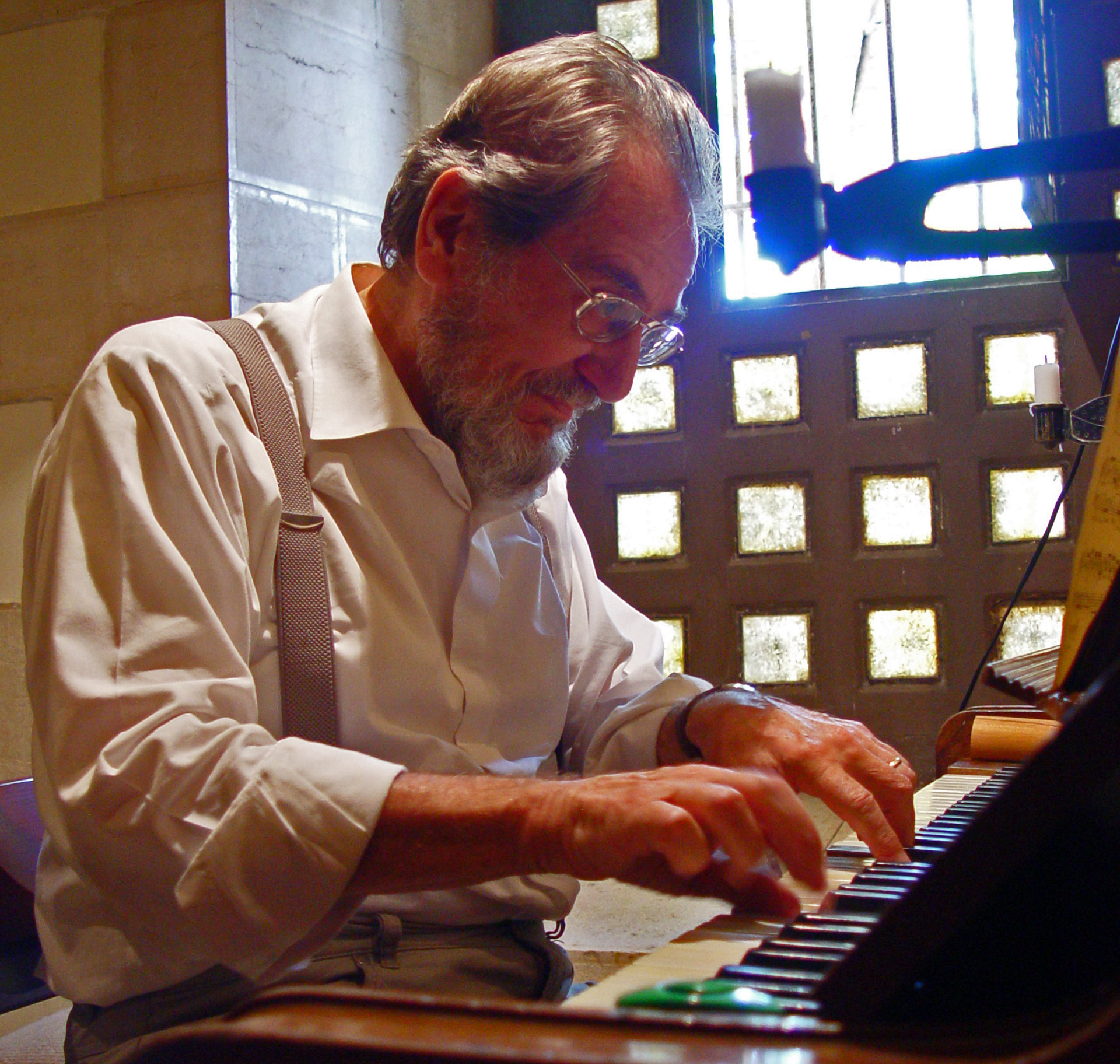
Blarr at the piano in the Ascension Church in Jerusalem in 2009

Blarr visited Israel to experience where Jesus lived as a Jew. In 1983, the Israeli composer Josef Tal dedicated his organ work Salva Venia to Blarr, who premiered it the following year in Düsseldorf. In 2016 he was awarded an honorary doctorate by the University of Warmia and Mazury in Olsztyn.

== Awards ==
- 1985 Kulturpreis der Landsmannschaft Ostpreußen for music
- 2006 Compositions prize of Neuss for Tangos und Choräle für Dietrich Bonhoeffer (Tangos and chorales for Dietrich Bonhoeffer), premiered on 15 June 2006 in the Christuskirche Neuss

== Selected works ==
The German National Library holds four works authored by Blarr, and 168 compositions, as of 2017:

=== Oratorio ===
- Jesus-Passion (1985)
- Jesus-Geburt. Weihnachtsoratorium (1988/91)
- Oster-Oratorium (1996)
- Die Himmelfahrt (2010)

=== Chamber music ===
- Psalm 47, a setting of Psalm 47 for soprano, tenor, choir (ad lib.), trumpet, trombone, percussion (steel drums), violin, harp and double bass (1998)
- Tangos and Chorales für Dietrich Bonhoeffer (2006)
- Stadt am Fluß, four short piano works (1. St. Lambertus, 2. Der Neandertaler, 3. Ich denke dein, 4. Karlrobert Kreiten); Edition Gravis, Bad Schwalbach, 1990.

=== Orchestra ===
- Symphony No. 1 "Janusz Korczak en karem concerto" (1985)
- Symphony No. 2 "Jerusalem" (1994)
- Symphony No. 3 "Zum ewigen Frieden" (2004)
- Symphony No. 4 ""Kopernikus" (premiere: Tonhalle Düsseldorf, 7 October 2011)

=== Organ ===
- Sonata Schaallu schlom Jeruschalajim (1 Psalmodie; 2 Rundgang; 3 Tropierter Choral)
- Lischuatcha kiwiti Adonai
- Kenne Sie die Geschichte ... ?
- Schlaflied für Mirjam
- Dream talk (1 Toccata 1; 2 Canon rythmique; 3 Toccata II per l'elevatione; 4 Canon à 6; 5 Toccata III, Final)
- Missa brevis (1 Kyrie "O milder Gott"; 2 Straßburger Gloria)
- Hommage (1 Initium und Organum triplum; 2 Organum aliquotum; 3 Organum accordum and Finalis)
- Handkuß für St. Margaretha
- Al har habajit – auf dem Tempelberg (für great and small organ) (1 Zipporim we Schofar; 2 Epitaph für S.B.C.; 3 Near eastern counterpoint; 4 Magrepha)
- "... qui tollis" – Seufzer für BAZI
- Roncalli-Nashorn Else
- Frühligsstimmen
- Zum ewigen Frieden

=== Neues Geistliches Lied ===
- "Weil du Ja zu mir sagst", text: Christine Heuser, first prize at the second competition of the Evangelische Akademie Tutzing in 1963
- "Shalom, wo die Liebe wohnt", text: Diethard Zils
- "Wer bringt dem Menschen, der blind ist, das Licht", text: Hans-Jürgen Netz

=== Arrangements ===
- Bilder einer Ausstellung (Pictures at an Exhibition) after Mussorgsky, for organ (1976)
- Stravinsky on the organ (1978)
