= Platz der Freiheit (München) =

Munich square

Coordinates: 48°09′14.4″N 11°32′11.9″E

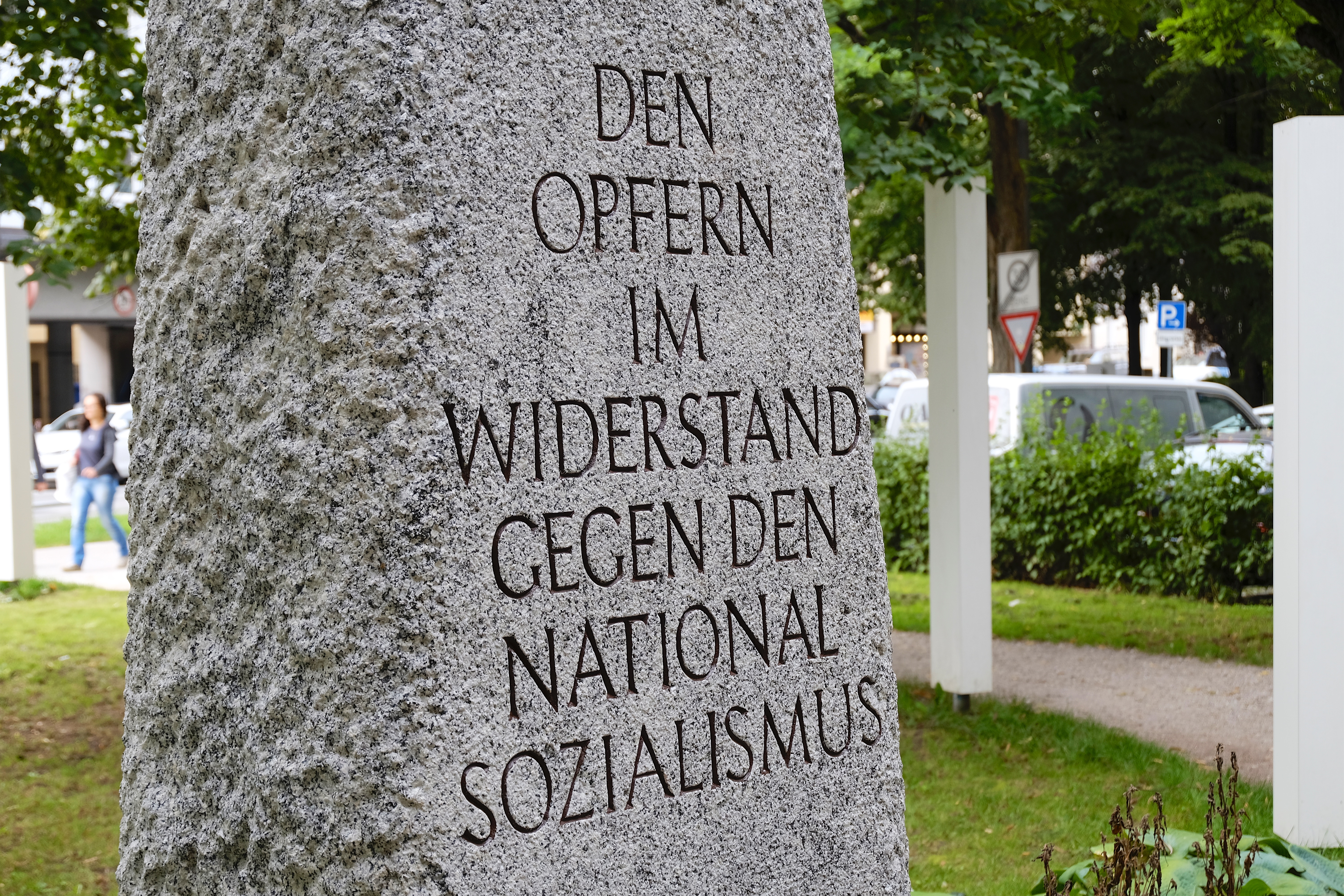
Inscription of the stone

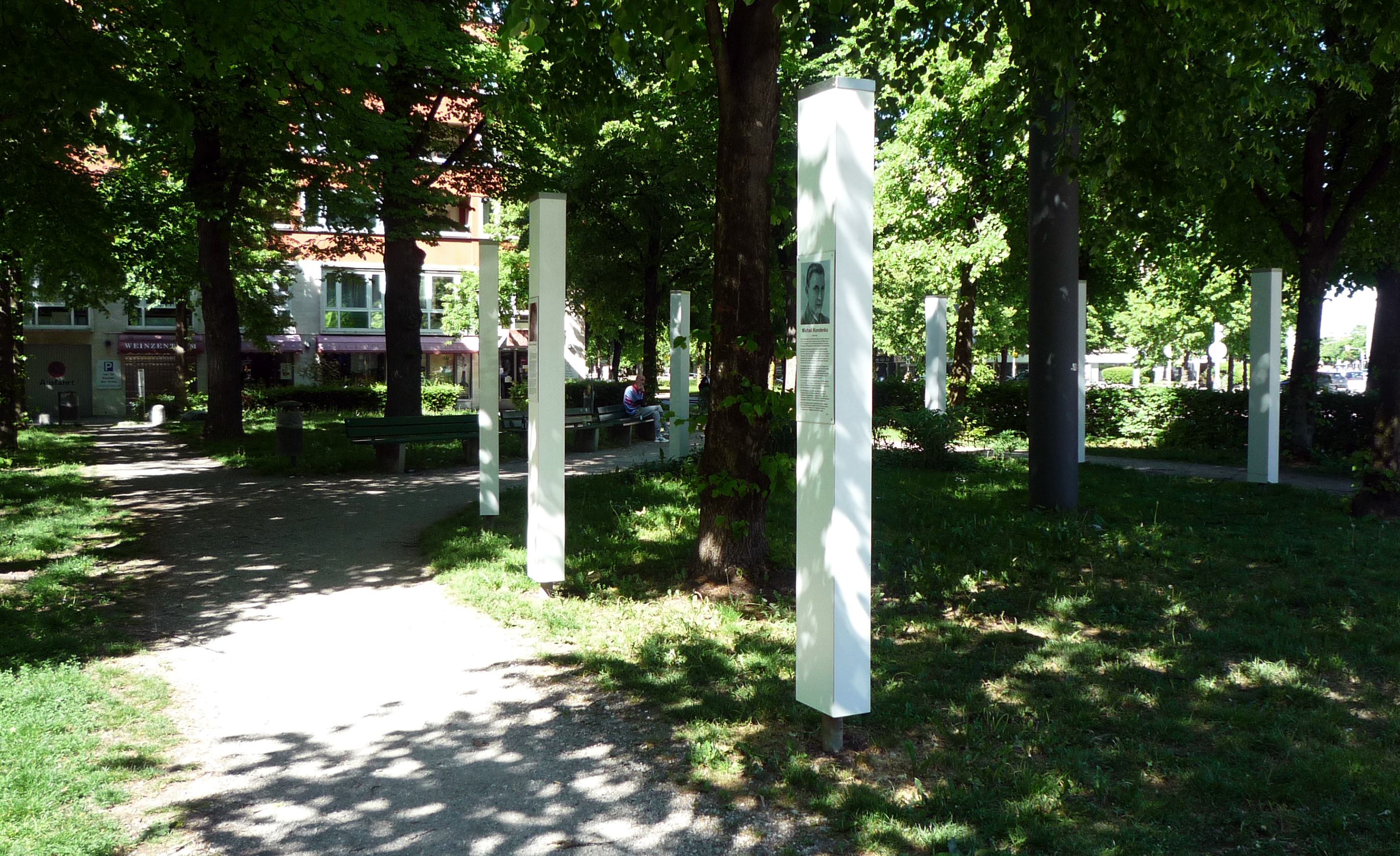
Resistance Memorial, 2025

The square at the intersection of Landshuter Allee / Leonrodstraße in the Neuhausen-Nymphenburg city district of Munich was named after Reich President Paul von Hindenburg in 1927.

== History ==
In 1946, the city council followed Control Council Directive No. 30 and renamed the square Platz der Freiheit (Freedom Square). In 1962, a memorial stone made of granite was erected on the Square of the Victims of National Socialism on Brienner Straße, designed by stonemason Karl Oppenrieder. In 1985, this stone with the inscription To the victims of resistance against National Socialism was moved to the northern edge of Freedom Square. For decades, the Freedom Square remained largely unnoticed as a place of remembrance and became increasingly neglected.

== Resistance Memorial ==
In 2013, Wolfram P. Kastner, Ernst Grube, Ingrid Reuther, Friedbert Mühldorfer, Eva Strauß, and Christoph Wilker developed a concept for the Resistance Memorial, declaring:

This memorial commemorates, by name and in a highly visible manner, the women and men who courageously resisted the Nazis in Munich at great personal risk.

The Resistance Memorial (Widerstandsdenkmal) was unveiled in July 2016. The steles present portraits and biographies of people who, for various reasons and in different ways, resisted the Nazi regime with words and deeds. In November 2016 and August 2017, the memorial was vandalized.

According to a decision by the Munich City Council, the Resistance Memorial will only remain in place until 2027. Munich citizens, foundations, and associations have been campaigning for years for the permanent preservation of the Resistance Memorial.

== Steles of commemoration ==
A total of 13 steles line the semi-oval path. The memorial stone is located approximately at the apex of the oval. A stele on the front of Leonrodstraße informs about the resistance memorial. 12 steles dedicated to 14 individuals are arranged in a counterclockwise direction:

- Franz Fellner (1922–1942) was a baker and deserter from the Kriegsmarine.
- Josefa Mack (1924–2006) belonged to the Roman Catholic School Sisters of Notre Dame.
- Sylvia Elvira Klar (1885–1942) and Max Klar (1875–1938) were spouses and escape agents of Wilhelm Hoegner.
- Ludwig Linsert (1907–1981) was a social democratic trade unionist.
- Martina Partsch (1896–1968) belonged to Jehovah's Witnesses.
- Otto Kohlhofer (1915–1988) was a mechanic and communist.
- Walter Klingenbeck (1924–1943) was an apprentice at Rohde & Schwarz.
- Ernst Lörcher (1907–1991) was a student and activist.
- Karl Schörghofer (1879–1962) was the Christian administrator of the Jewish cemetery in Munich and saved eight Jewish lives.
- Marie-Luise Jahn (1918–2010) continued the work of the Weiße Rose.
- Michail Kondenko (1906–1944) was a major of the Red Army and a forced laborer.
- Emma Hutzelmann (1900–1944) and Hans Hutzelmann (1906–1945) were German communists.
