= Rieger–Kloss =

Pipe organ manufacturer

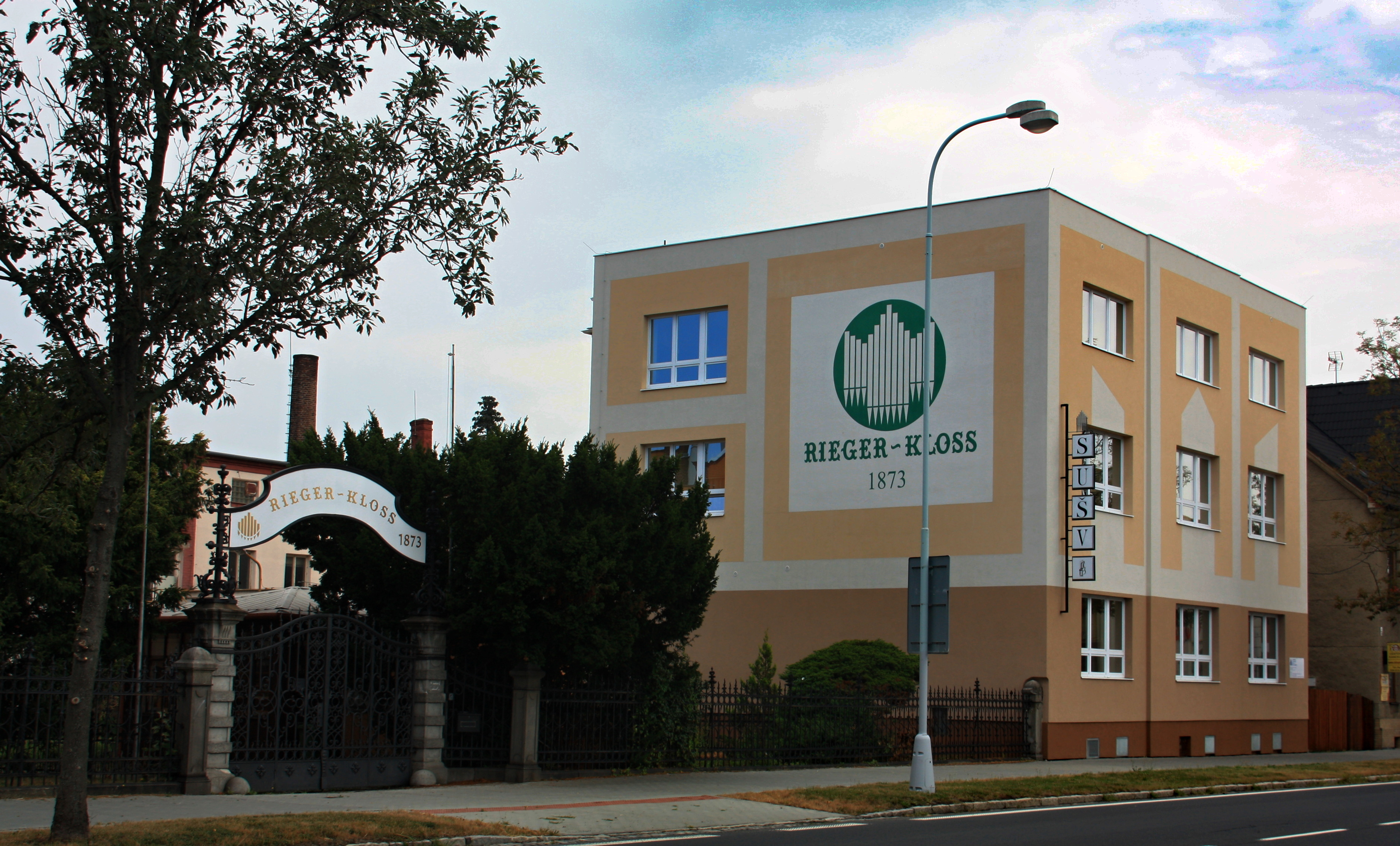
- Founded: 1873
- Defunct: 1 December 2022
- Headquarters: Krnov, Czech Republic

Rieger–Kloss is a company specializing in the manufacturing of pipe organ. Its headquarters as well as the production facilities are located in Krnov, Czech Republic.

== History ==
Rieger–Kloss date their establishment to 1873, by the Rieger brothers; they claim a common history with Rieger Orgelbau up to the end of World War II. Following the war, the Czechoslovak government expelled the Ethnic German owners and workers of the original firm from Czechoslovakia, and nationalised the Rieger company. In 1948 they were merged with the workshop of Josef Kloss, which had also been nationalised, to form a new company called 'Rieger–Kloss'. The workers and owners of the original firm founded a new firm in Austria as 'Rieger Orgelbau'.

Rieger–Kloss met with success at the World Exhibition Expo 58, which led to 46 commissions in republics of the Soviet Union. The company became privately owned in 1994. Floods in July 1997 halted production for four weeks and caused great damage to property. They have built over 600 organs using pneumatic, electro-pneumatic and tracker action, and made a large number of restorations of historic instruments. They are now active in America and Asia. They build organs in the full range of sizes, from portative organs and compact instruments to large cathedral instruments, and employ about 70 people. They also make guitars and there is a company of the same name which makes pianos.

In 1997 the production facilities of the company were severely damaged. 2011 entrepreneur Jakub Škrbel took over the company. The company went bankrupt in 2018.

== The Rieger–Kloss School of Organ Building ==
Rieger–Kloss established a school of organ building in 1992. They take in twelve students from all over Europe each year, who pursue a four-year course of intensive study culminating in difficult written and practical exams. In order to graduate, each student must build a complete organ on their own. Subjects they cover include the English, German, French, and Czech languages, mathematics, organ playing, organ history, physics, mechanics, pipe and action building, acoustics, electrical engineering, technology, quality of materials, technical drawing, economics, and gymnastics.

== Notable Rieger–Kloss organs ==
- Slovak Philharmonic Society, Bratislava, 1956
- Belarusian State Philharmonic, Minsk, 1963
- Congress Hall, Prague, 1981
- St. Egyd, Klagenfurt, 1992
- Xinghai Concert Hall, Guangzhou, 1995
- Trinity Lutheran Church, Roselle, Illinois, 1996
- Concert Hall of the New Conservatory, Ostrava, 1996

== Sources ==
- Alfred Reichling: 'Rieger', Grove Music Online ed. L. Macy (Accessed 2007-07-01), http://www.grovemusic.com/
- Varhany Krnov, 1873–1973 (Krnov, 1973)
- Rieger–Kloss (Krnov, 1995)
