= Sędławki =

- Village
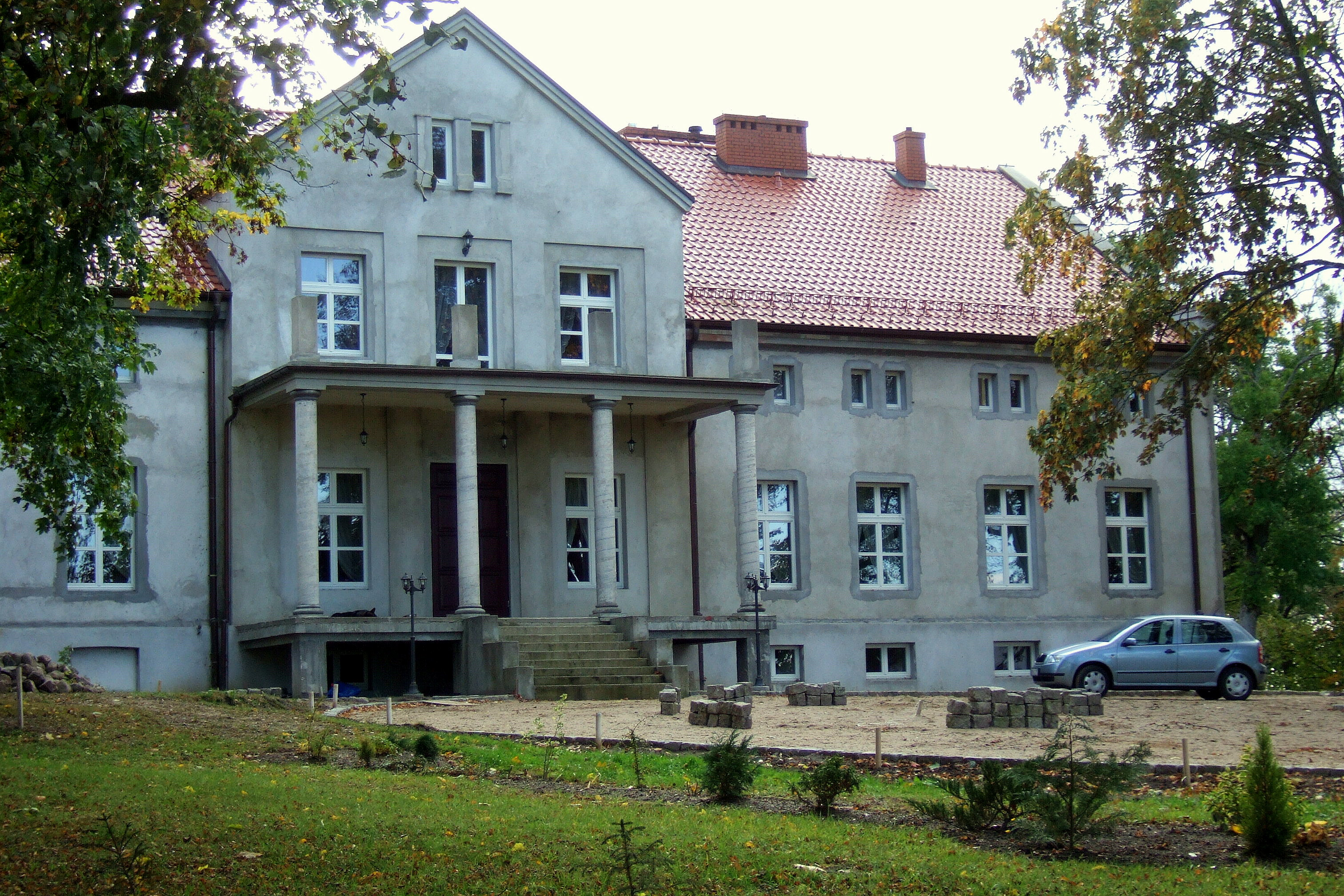
- Old manor house, former residence of the Jahn family

- Location within Poland
- Coordinates: 54°13′45″N 20°50′15″E
- Country: Poland
- Voivodeship: Warmian-Masurian
- County: Bartoszyce
- Gmina: Bartoszyce
- Time zone: UTC+1 (CET)
  - Summer (DST): UTC+2 (CEST)
- Vehicle registration: NBA

Sędławki [sɛnˈdwafkʲi] (German: Sandlack) is a village in the administrative district of Gmina Bartoszyce, within Bartoszyce County, Warmian-Masurian Voivodeship, in northern Poland, close to the border with Kaliningrad Oblast in Russia.

== History ==
In 1454, King Casimir IV Jagiellon incorporated the region into the Kingdom of Poland. After the subsequent Thirteen Years' War (1454–1466), it was a part of Poland as a fief held by the Teutonic Order.

From the 18th century, the village was part of the Kingdom of Prussia, and from 1871 to 1945 it was also part of Germany, administratively located in the province of East Prussia. The village is the site of a well-preserved manor house, built in neoclassical style in the second half of the 19th century. It was first owned by the Puttlichs, and later became the residence of the Jahn family whose most notable member was Marie-Luise Jahn.

The manor house was abandoned during the East Prussian Offensive in World War II. It was restored in 2000.

== Notable residents ==
- Marie-Luise Jahn (1918–2010), German resistance fighter
- Oskar Gottlieb Blarr (born 1934), German composer
