= Peter Planyavsky =

Austrian organist and composer (born 1947)

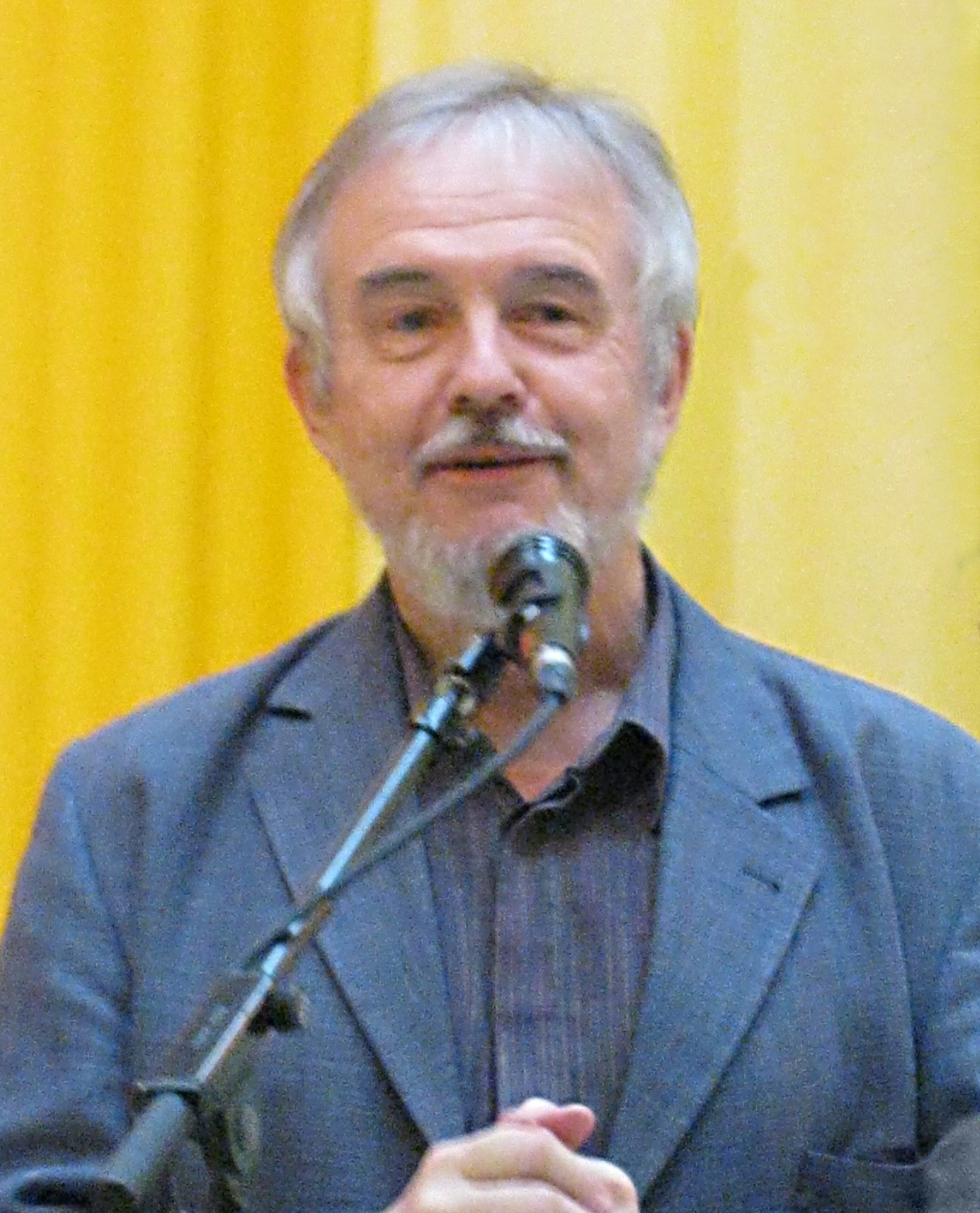
- Planyavsky in 2011
- Born: 9 May 1947 (age 77); Vienna, Austria
- Education: Vienna Academy of Music
- Occupations: Organist at St. Stephen's Cathedral; Composer
- Parent: Alfred Planyavsky
- Website: www.peterplanyavsky.at

Planyavsky improvises on the hymn "Gelobet sei der Herr" (Rieger organ of Neanderkirche Düsseldorf 1998).

Planyavsky plays his composition Fantasia in memoriam A. H. (Rieger organ of Neanderkirche Düsseldorf 1998; live).

Peter Planyavsky (born 9 May 1947) is an Austrian organist and composer. He attended the Schottengymnasium. After graduating from the Vienna Academy of Music in 1966 he spent a year in an organ workshop, and has been instrumental in organ-building projects, notably the construction of the Rieger organ in the Great Hall of the Wiener Musikverein. In 1968 he was appointed organist in the Upper Austrian Stift Schlägl, and the following year organist at Vienna's St. Stephen's Cathedral. From 1983 until 1990 Planyavsky was their director of music, with overall responsibility for church music at the cathedral.

Planyavsky has recorded all the organ works of composers such as Johannes Brahms and Felix Mendelssohn, and has conducted not only the great works of sacred music but neglected organ concertos such as those by Alfredo Casella and Aaron Copland. He has also composed sacred music for organ, choir, and orchestra, and is known for parodies in the style of Bach, Haydn and Mozart, as P.P. Bach, J.P. Haydn and W.A.P. Mozart.

== Career ==
Born in Vienna, the son of Alfred Planyavsky, he attended the Schotten gymnasium. At the Vienna Academy of Music, he studied organ, composition and improvisation with Anton Heiller, piano with Hilde Seidlhofer, and conducting with Hans Gillesberger. He graduated with diplomas in organ and church music in 1966. Subsequently, he worked for a year in an organ workshop (intonation and assembly), and in 1968 he was organist in the Upper Austrian Stift Schlägl.

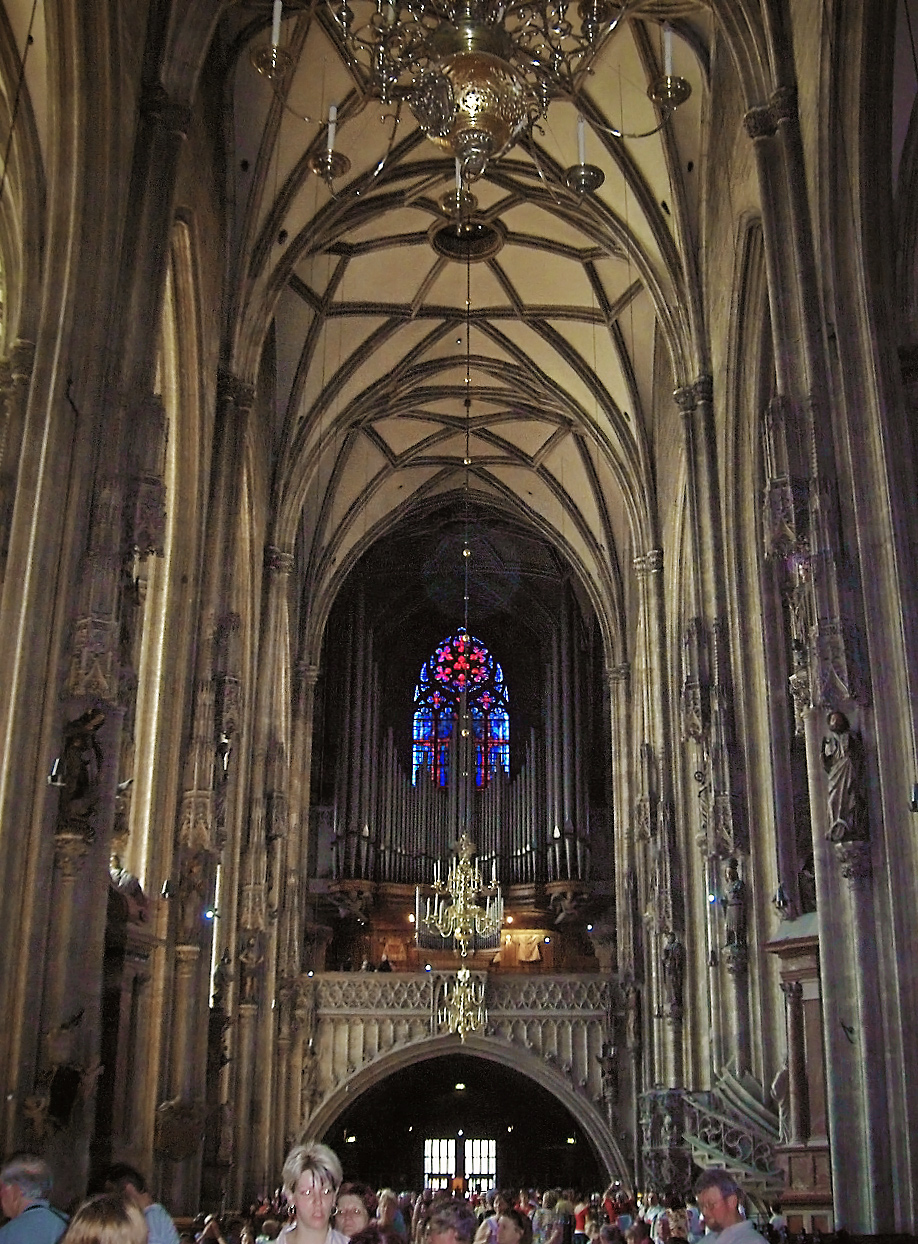
St. Stephen's Cathedral, Vienna, where Planyavsky was director of music from 1983 until 1990

From 1969 to 2004, Planyavsky was organist at Vienna's cathedral Stephansdom (St. Stephen's Cathedral), and in the years 1983 to 1990 was Dommusikdirektor, director of music with overall responsibility for the church music at the cathedral.

In 1980 he was appointed professor of organ, improvisation and liturgical organ playing at the Vienna Academy of Music. From 1996 to 2002 he headed the department of church music.

Concert tours and master classes took Planyavsky to many European countries, Japan, Australia, South Africa, Hong Kong, Korea, Canada and the United States. In his master classes he has focused on Anton Heiller, Johannes Brahms, Felix Mendelssohn and Baroque music, with an emphasis on improvisation and liturgical organ playing. He has often served as a juror at competitions.

Planyavsky recorded numerous LPs and CDs, such as recordings of all the organ works of Johannes Brahms and Felix Mendelssohn.

As a conductor Planyavsky has emerged not only with the great works of sacred music, but also the neglected sector of organ concertos, conducting concertos by Alfredo Casella, Aaron Copland, Howard Hanson, Jean Langlais, Ottorino Respighi, and Leo Sowerby.

Planyavsky composed for organ, choral and orchestral music. His motet for SSATB choir a cappella, Der 269. Psalm (Psalm 269), combines text from Psalms 148 and 121. One of his specialties is parody. His cantata Der zufriedengestellte Autobus (The contented bus) by P.P. Bach, a parody of a Bach cantata, was given more than 40 times. The cantata "Cactus tragicus", alluding to the title of Bach's Actus tragicus, premiered on 19 February 2004 in Klagenfurt. As J.P. Haydn he composed the Ankunftssymphonie in 1987, as W. A. Plagiavsky Mozart Vier Stücke für die Trompetenuhr (Four pieces for the trumpet clock) in 1989.

As an organ expert, Planyavsky was instrumental in organ-building projects, notably the construction of the new Rieger organ in the Great Hall of the Wiener Musikverein, which he planned in collaboration with Ludger Lohmann, Martin Haselböck, Gillian Weir, and Olivier Latry.

== Awards ==
- Government Support Prize for Music in 1991 for his choral compositions
- Orlando di Lasso-Medaille (2004)
- Golden Medal of the Province of Vienna (2005)
- Prize for Music of the Republic of Austria (2006)

== Publications ==
- Moritz Reger und andere Schrägheiten. Dr. J. Butz, Sankt Augustin 2005, ISBN 3-928412-04-3.
- Gerettet vom Stephansdom. Edition VA bENE, Wien 2007, ISBN 3-851671-88-0.
- Anton Heiller. Alle Register eines Lebens. Edition VA bENE, Wien 2009.
- Katholische Kirchenmusik. Praxis und liturgische Hintergründe. Tyrolia, Innsbruck 2010, ISBN 978-3-7022-3094-4.

== Compositions ==
- Kohelet, cantata for baritone, speaker, choir, organ and percussion, commission of the Gesellschaft der Musikfreunde in Wien (2011)
- W. A. P. Mozart: Eine nicht gerade kleine Nachtmusik (2005)
- P. P. Bach, Cactus tragicus, cantata for soprano, tenor, bass, choir and orchestra (LWV 19204) (2004)
- Hochzeit in Kana, sacred opera (1998)
- Der 269. Psalm for choir a cappella (1989)
- W. A. Plagiavsky Mozart: Vier Stücke für die Trompetenuhr (1989)
- W. A. P. Mozart: Die Schaffnerin aus Liebe, ein höchst bürgerliches Singspiel (1987)
- J. P. Haydn: Ankunftssymphonie (1987)
- Die vier Männer im Feuerofen - Eine biblische Ballade für Sopran und Orgel (1985)
- P. P. Bach: Der zufriedengestellte Autobus (1985)
- Missa Viennensis (1972)
- Toccata alla Rumba for organ (1971)
