= Marie-Luise Jahn =

German physician and resistance member (1918–2010)

- Born: 28 May 1918; Sandlack, East Prussia, Germany (now Sędławki, Poland)
- Died: 22 June 2010 (aged 92); Bad Tölz, Germany
- Education: Ludwig-Maximilians-Universität München; University of Tübingen
- Occupations: Physician and resistance member

Marie-Luise Jahn (28 May 1918 – 22 June 2010) was a German physician and a member of the anti-Nazi resistance movement White Rose during World War II.

== Biography ==
Jahn was born in Sandlack, East Prussia (today Sędławki, Poland), where she grew up. From 1934 to 1937, she attended school in Berlin and began her studies in chemistry at the Ludwig-Maximilians-Universität München in 1940. There, Jahn became a close friend of Hans Conrad Leipelt and a member of the White Rose resistance group. After Hans and Sophie Scholl and Christoph Probst had been imprisoned, she continued to publish the Scholl leaflets and collected money to aid the widow of Kurt Huber. In October 1943, she was also arrested by the Gestapo for treason and sentenced to 12 years' imprisonment by the Volksgerichtshof in 1944. She served 1.5 years of that sentence before the war ended.

After her liberation, she studied medicine at the University of Tübingen and worked as a physician in Bad Tölz in Bavaria, Germany. In 1987, she was a founding member of the White Rose Foundation; she was a member of the executive board until 2002.

Her conviction was officially overturned on 8 September 2009 by the German Parliament when it cleared all World War II convictions for treason.

Jahn died in Bad Tölz on 22 June 2010, at the age of 92.

== Remembrance ==
In 2002, Marie-Luise Jahn has been awarded with the Bavarian Order of Merit.

Since 2016, a stele of the Resistance Memorial at Platz der Freiheit (München) commemorates Marie-Luise Jahn.

In 2019, a street in Freiham, a district of Munich, was named after her.

In 2020, a special education centre at Bad Tölz has been named Marie-Luise-Jahn-Schule.

In 2024, Marie-Luise Jahn was part of the Light Memorial Faces for the Names at the front of the Justizpalast (Munich) commemorating women in resistance against Nazi terror.

== Literature ==
- Marie-Luise Schultze-Jahn: "... und ihr Geist lebt trotzdem weiter!" - Widerstand im Zeichen der Weißen Rose, (tr. "...and their spirit lives on! - Resistance under the sign of the White Rose") Berlin 2003, ISBN 9783936411256 (in German)
