= Martin Schmeding =

German church musician and organist

- Born: 1975 (age 49–50); Minden, Germany
- Education: Musikhochschule Hannover
- Occupations: Organist; Academic teacher
- Organizations: Hochschule für Musik Freiburg; Hochschule für Musik und Theater Leipzig.
- Awards: ARD International Music Competition; Preis der deutschen Schallplattenkritik; Echo Klassik

Martin Schmeding (born 1975) is a German church musician, concert organist and academic teacher, who has made recordings of the complete organ works by composers such as Brahms, Mendelssohn, Franz Schmidt, Max Reger and Tilo Medek.

== Career ==
Born in Minden, Schmeding studied church music, music pedagogy, recorder, organ, conducting, harpsichord and music theory at the Musikhochschule Hannover, at the Sweelinck Conservatory in Amsterdam and the Robert Schumann Hochschule in Düsseldorf. His teachers included the organist Jean Boyer, Ulrich Bremsteller, Hans van Nieuwkoop, Jacques van Oortmerssen and Lajos Rovatkay. In 1999 he succeeded Oskar Gottlieb Blarr as cantor and organist at the Neanderkirche in Düsseldorf. From 2002 to 2004, he was the Kreuzorganist at the Kreuzkirche in Dresden. In 2004 he was appointed professor at the Hochschule für Musik Freiburg, where he has been president of the institute for church music from 2012. He is Titularorganist of the Ludwigskirche, and the conductor of the Herdermer Vokalensemble. From 2015 he has also been a professor of organ at the Hochschule für Musik und Theater Leipzig.

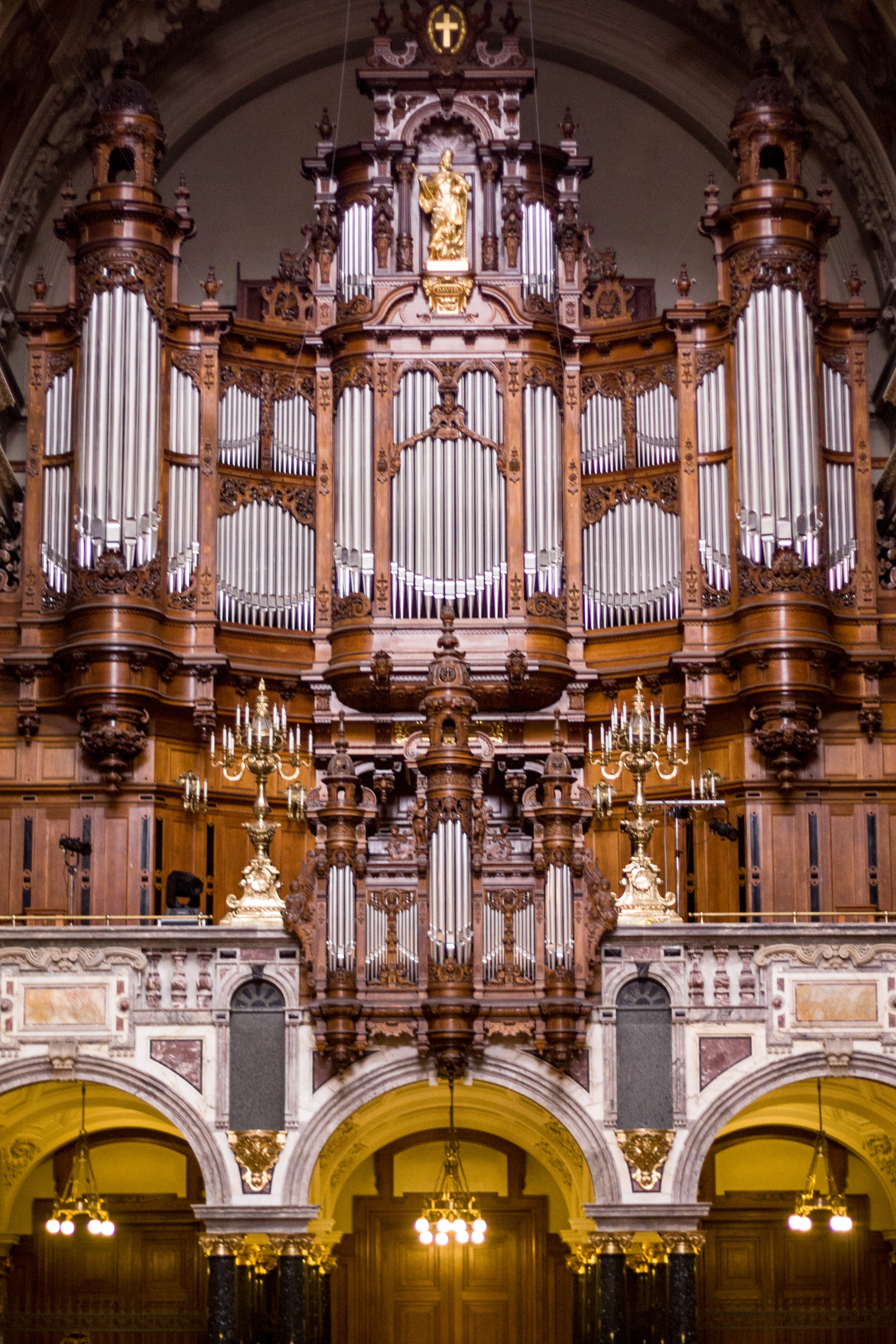
The organ of the Berlin Cathedral, where Schmeding recorded Vol. 14 of the complete works by Max Reger

Schmeding recorded, among others, the complete organ works by Johannes Brahms, Felix Mendelssohn, Franz Schmidt and Max Reger. He performed Reger's works for the label Cybele, completed in 2016, on thirteen different organs from the composer's time, including Walcker organs, at St. Anne's Church, Annaberg-Buchholz, at the Protestant Church, Essen-Werden and the Lutherkirche, Wiesbaden, and Sauer organs, at the Berlin Cathedral, in the church of Dobrilugk Abbey, and in Leipzig's Michaelskirche and Nikolaikirche. The recording was selected as "recording of the month" (October) by MusicWeb International.

== Awards ==
Schmeding was awarded prizes at organ competitions including the Mendelssohn competition in Berlin, the Pachelbel competition in Nürnberg, the Ritter competition in Magdeburg, the Böhm competition in Lüneburg, competitions at the academies of Hannover and Mannheim, the Deutscher Musikwettbewerb in Berlin, the European competition for young organists in Ljubljana and the Musica Antiqua Bruges. In 1999 he was a finalist of the ARD International Music Competition in Munich. In 2009 he received a prize of the Preis der deutschen Schallplattenkritik for his recording of the organ works by Tilo Medek on the label Cybele. In 2010 he was named "instrumentalist of the year" by Echo Klassik for his recording of an organ version of Bach's Goldberg Variations.
