= Alfred Planyavsky =

- Born: January 22, 1924; Vienna
- Origin: Austria
- Died: 18 June 2013 (aged 89)
- Genres: Classical music
- Occupations: Performer and music historian
- Instrument: Double bass
- Website: www.alfredplanyavsky.at

Alfred Planyavsky (22 January 1924 – 18 June 2013) was an Austrian double-bassist and music historian.

Born in Vienna, Planyavsky was a member of the boys choir Wiener Sängerknaben between 1933 and 1938. In 1946, he began studying as a tenor and double bass player at the Vienna Academy of Music. After seven years at the academy, he joined the Vienna Symphony Orchestra in 1954. He was later a member of the Vienna State Opera Orchestra, the Vienna Philharmonic and the Vienna Hofmusikkapelle. He has also been a double bass instructor for members of the Wiener Sängerknaben.

Planyavsky conducted important research into the history of the double bass and Viennese music. His first major work was Geschichte des Kontrabasses (On the History of the Double Bass), first published in 1970 with a revised edition in 1984. This was followed by his 1989 volume Der Barock-Kontrabass Violone, which covered the history of the violone as a bass instrument in the Baroque era. It was issued in English translation as The Baroque Double Bass Violone, and has been well received by critics. The Journal of the American Musical Instrument Society described his book, along with those of Brun and Elgar, as "pioneering" works on the evolution of the double bass, but state that the books are heavily reliant upon secondary sources.

In addition to his books, Planyavsky wrote many articles for the journals Österreichische Musikzeitschrift and Das Orchester. In 1974 he began a collection of documents related to the double bass, called Kontrabass-Archiv (Double Bass Archive), and in 1986 donated it to the music collection of the Austrian National Library.

His son Peter Planyavsky is an organist and composer.

Stephan Bonta summarised: "In a real sense, Planyavsky has given his life to the double bass, the instrument that for years he played professionally in Vienna."
