= Neanderkirche =

Protestant church in the centre of Düsseldorf, Germany

Coordinates: 51°13′36″N 6°46′28″E

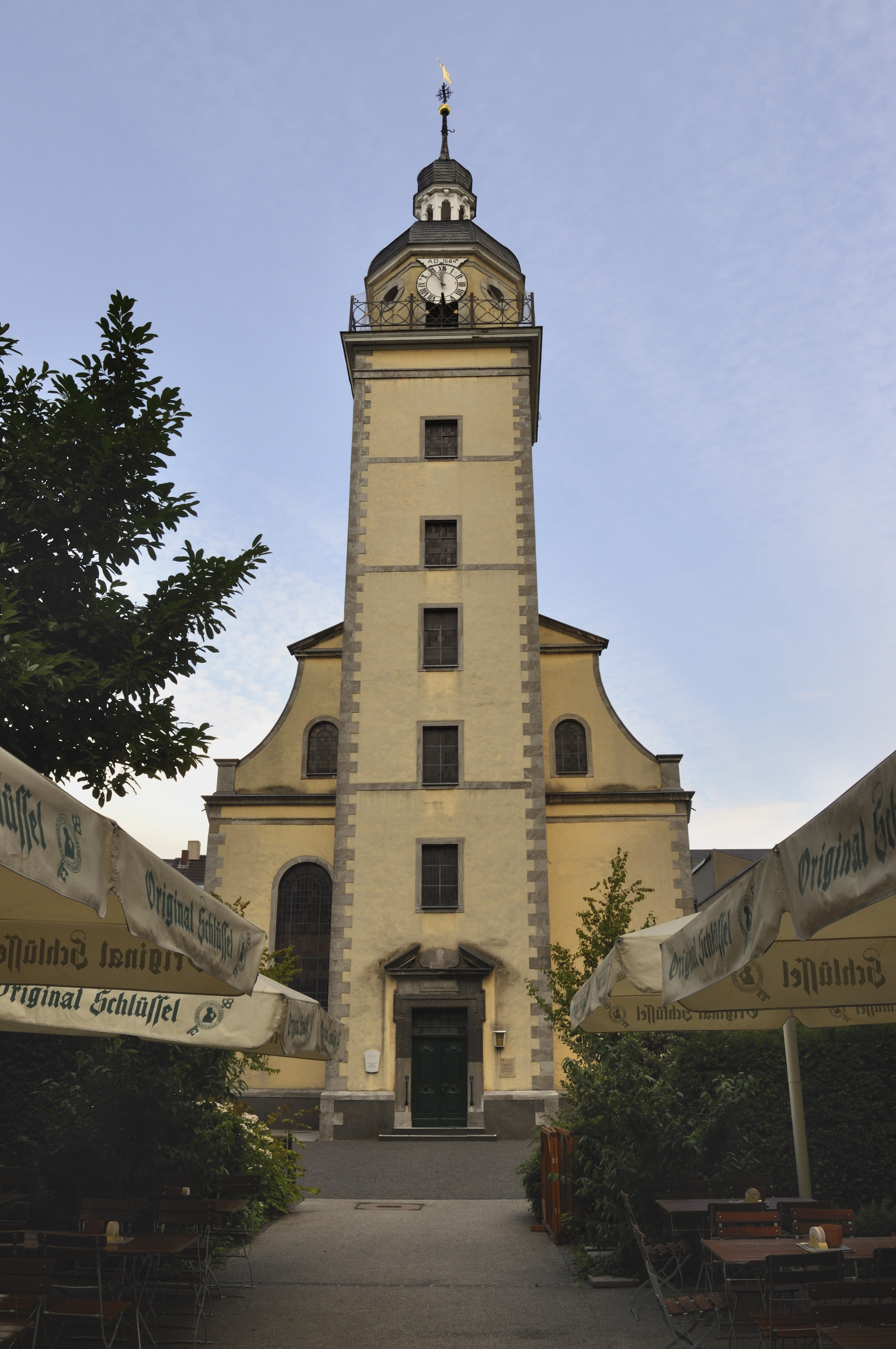
- Tower facade
- Location: Düsseldorf
- Country: Germany
- Denomination: Protestant Church in the Rhineland
- Website: www.neanderkirche.de/neander/index.php

The Neanderkirche (Neander Church) is a Protestant church in the centre of Düsseldorf, the Altstadt. The building in early Baroque style was completed in 1687 and later named after the Reformed minister and hymn writer Joachim Neander. It is now a parish church of the Evangelische Kirchengemeinde Düsseldorf-Mitte. In 1965, a Rieger organ was installed, which is also used for a series of summer concerts.

== History ==
When the counter reformation began in Düsseldorf, activities of the reformed Protestant church were still tolerated for a while. A Predigthaus (preaching house) was built on the property of the later church in 1610, but had to be closed in 1614 when the tolerance ended. Protestant Christians were permitted to build churches again only in the second half of the 17th century. The Neanderkirche was built from 1683 to 1687. The church was already inaugurated in 1684. It was named after Joachim Neander in 1916.

The Neanderkirche is a hall church of the early Baroque. It is now the church of the parish Evangelische Kirchengemeinde Düsseldorf-Mitte.

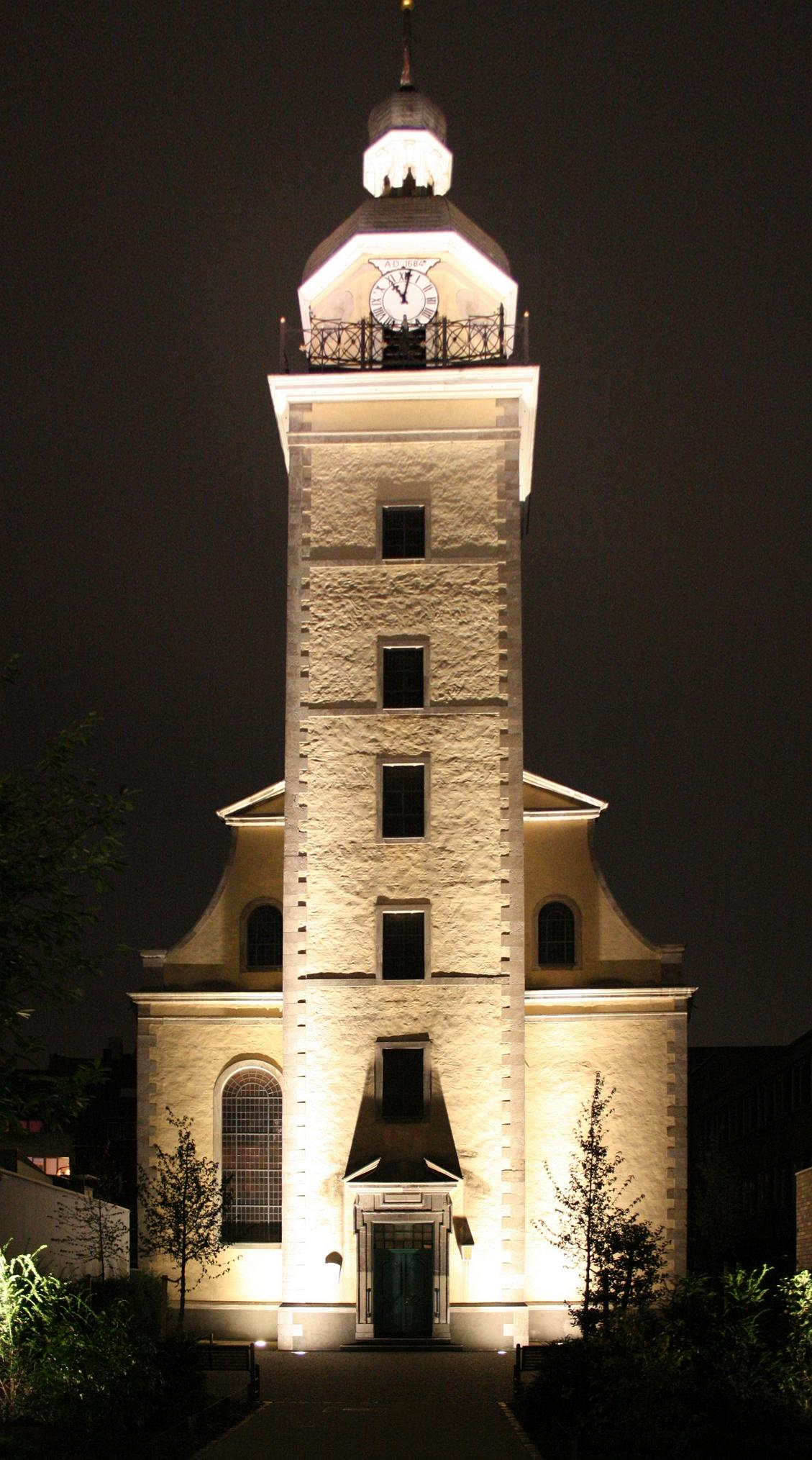
Neanderkirche at night

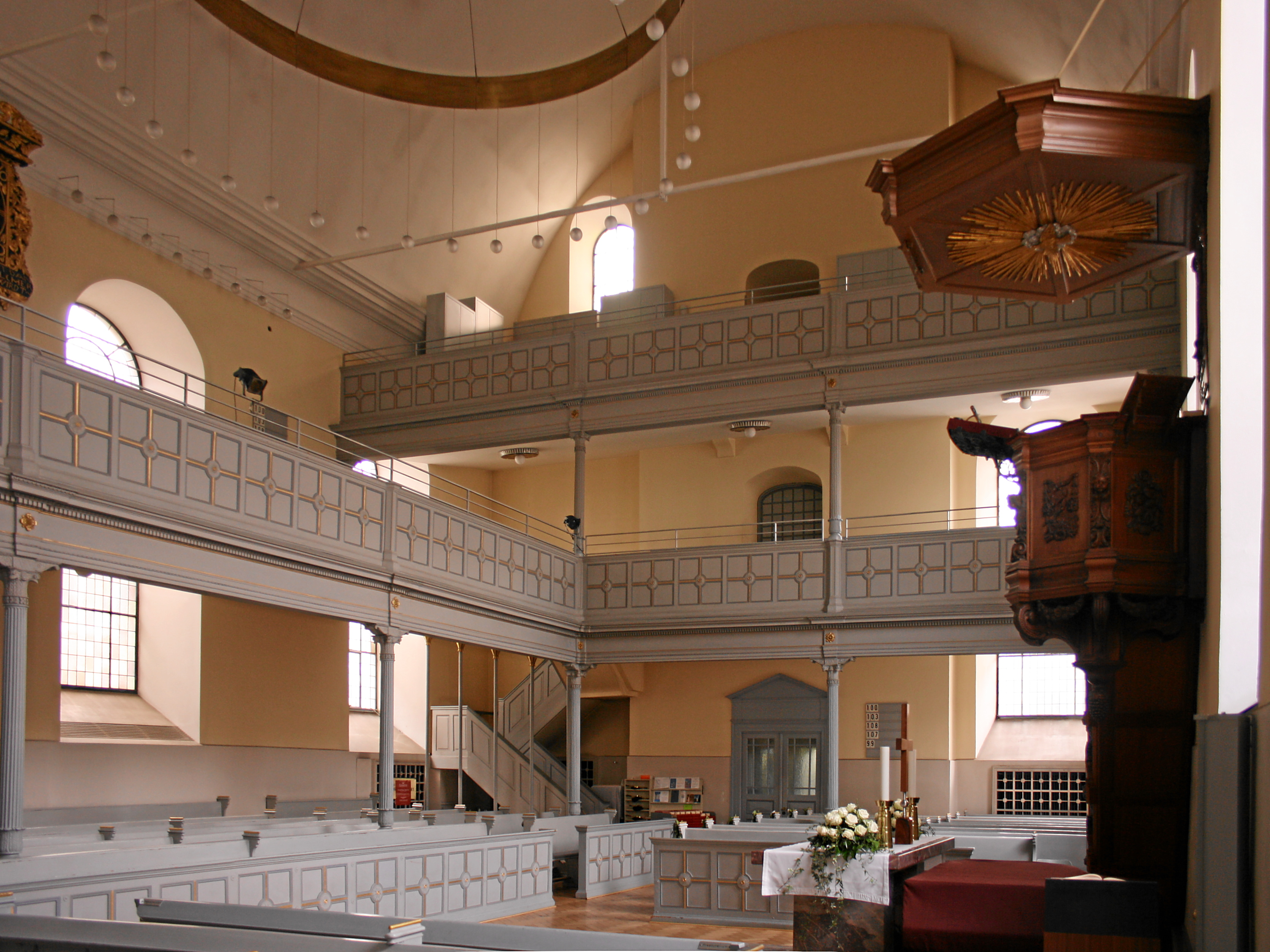
Interior

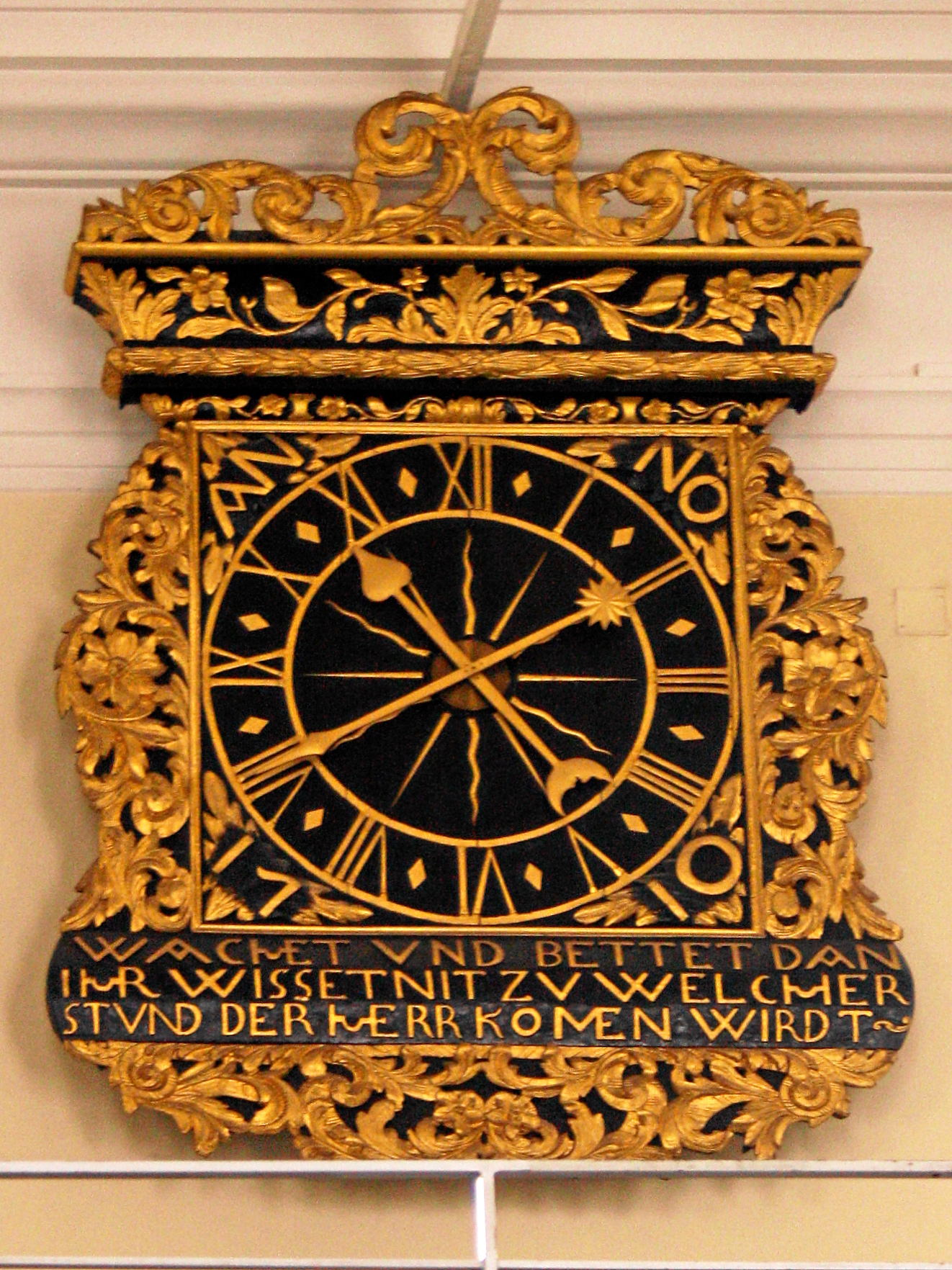
Baroque clock

== Church music ==
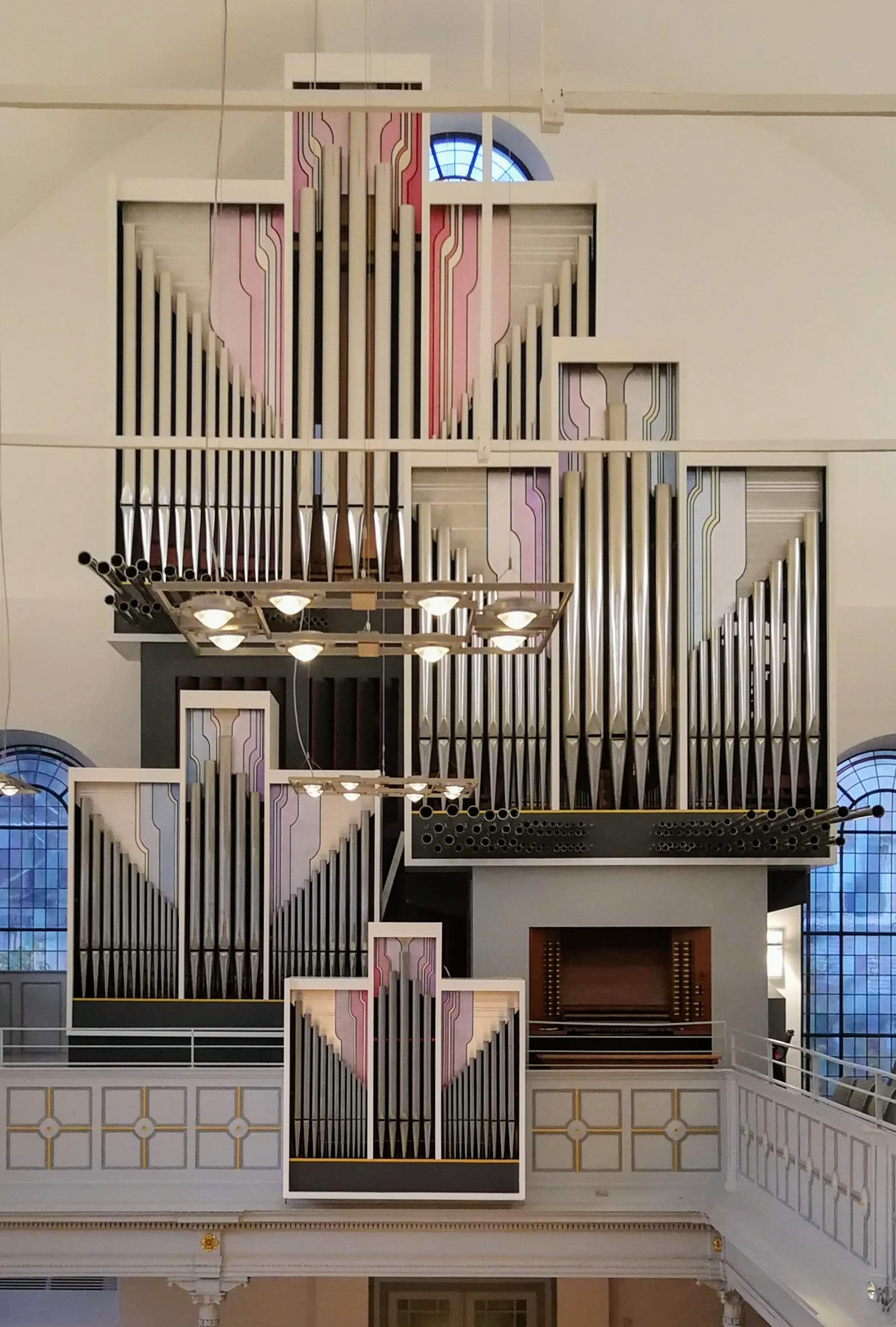
The Rieger organ

Peter Planyavsky improvises on the hymn "Gelobet sei der Herr" (1998).

An organ was completed in 1965 by Rieger Orgelbau after a design by Gerhard Schwarz and Hubert Meyers. It is suitable for organ concerts. A series of summer organ concerts, Sommerlichen Orgelkonzerte, has a tradition of more than fifty years. Every year between the end of June and the middle of September, 12 to 14 concerts are played by organists from Düsseldorf and international guests. A choir was founded by the church musician Oskar Gottlieb Blarr who conducted the group until 1999, when he was succeeded by Martin Schmeding. From 2003, Sebastian Klein has conducted the choir.

== Literature ==
- Theo Lücker: Steine sprechen. Kleiner Wegweiser durch die Düsseldorfer Altstadt. Verlag T. Ewers, Düsseldorf 1977, S. 80–81 [Nr. 39 Die Neanderkirche].
- Gisela Vollmer: Die Neanderkirche in Düsseldorf. Beiträge zur Baugeschichte. In: Düsseldorfer Jahrbuch Nr. 49, 1959, S. 176–185.
- Ingo Beucker: Die Neanderkirche in Düsseldorf. Restaurierung und Einfügung in das Stadtbild in den Jahren 1957 bis 1959. In: Düsseldorfer Jahrbuch Nr. 49, 1959, S. 185–195.
