= Rieger Orgelbau =

Austrian organ builder firm

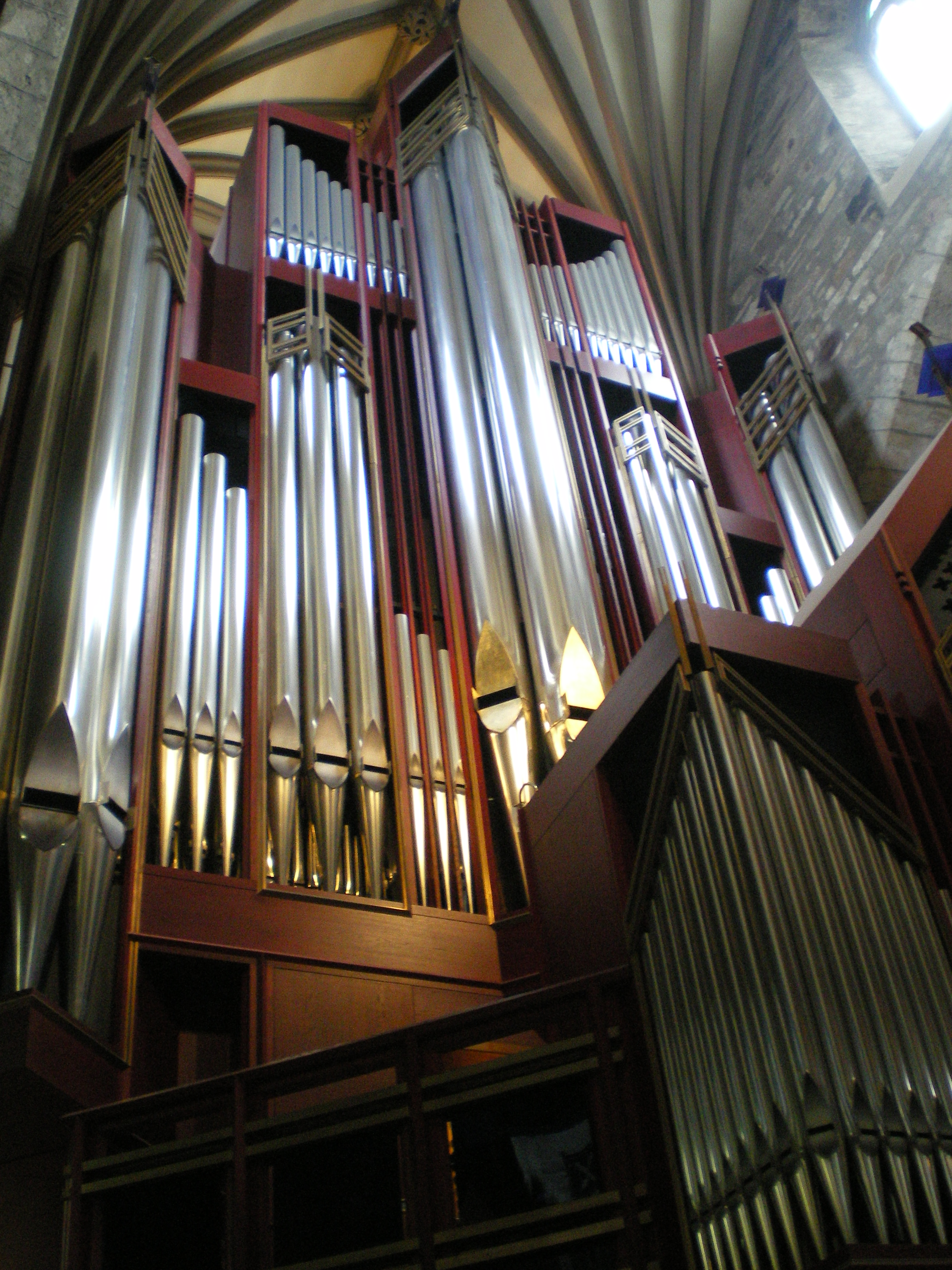
The 1992 Rieger organ at St Giles' Cathedral, Edinburgh.

Rieger Orgelbau is an Austrian firm of organ builders, known generally as Rieger. The firm was founded by Franz Rieger. From 1873 it was known as Rieger & Söhne, and from 1879 as Gebrüder Rieger, after his sons took over. At the end of World War II, the firm was nationalised by the Czech government and merged with another workshop as Rieger-Kloss. The Rieger tradition was also continued by the owners and workers of the original firm, who moved to Austria and founded a new workshop as "Rieger Orgelbau".

== History ==
=== Franz Rieger ===
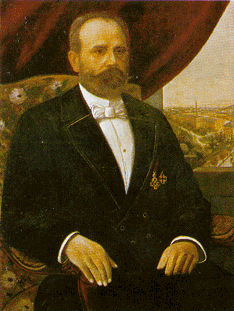
Franz Rieger

Franz Rieger was born in Zossen (Sosnová) in Austrian Silesia on 13 December 1812, and was the son of a gardener. He received a good education and decided to become an organ builder, to which end he travelled to Vienna, where he was apprenticed to organ-builder Joseph Seybert. His apprenticeship and time as a journeyman being completed, he returned home in 1844 as a master organ-builder. He married Rosalia Schmidt, with whom he had nine children, and completed his opus 1, a twenty-stop, two-manual and pedal organ, for the Burgberg Church, in 1845. He was accepted on the Trade and Industry Register of the Austrian Monarchy in 1852. He built organs in the classical tradition, and gained a high reputation. Through the work of his sons under his name, he was awarded the Golden Cross for Service in 1879 by Imperial decree. He died in Jägerndorf on 29 January 1886.

=== Otto and Gustav Rieger ===
Two of Franz Rieger's sons followed their father in his craft: Otto Rieger (3 March 1847 – 12 December 1903) and Gustav Rieger (1 August 1848 – 1905), served apprenticeships with their father. They then spent time as journeymen in Vienna, where they trained from 1864 with Franz Ullmann, another builder in the classical tradition. They also spent time in Bamberg and Würzburg, where they visited the workshop of noted Franconian innovator Balthasar Schlimbach. Upon their return home in 1873, their father passed his workshop to them, remaining in a consultative capacity until 1880; the name of the firm became "Franz Rieger & Söhne" and the opus count was restarted at zero. Otto married in 1873 and Gustav followed suit in 1874.

Their opus 1 was exhibited at the Vienna World Exhibition in Vienna, at which it won a gold medal; this organ is now in the church of St Peter & Paul in Jaktař. One of their first changes from their father's work was the replacement of slider chests with mechanical cone chests. Their first year saw the production of three organs. Their reputation grew apace: in 1874 they won their first commission in the Imperial Capital, Vienna, followed in 1875 by a commission in Hungary. Their first commission in a non-Habsburg country was in 1876 in Norway. They exhibited two salon organs at the 1878 Paris Exposition, one of which, sold to London, marked their first overseas transaction.

They bought a new site in 1879 to cope with their expanding business, on which larger workshops and dwellings for their workers were built. With this move, the name was changed to "Gebrüder Rieger". They developed a series of twenty five small organs, with between two and twenty five stops and an optional second manual for those with more than eight stops, as an alternative to the much cheaper harmonium. These organs were responsible for the high opus count of Rieger organs of this period.

By 1883, their annual production of organs had risen to sixteen. They built their first three-manual instrument in 1884. Their geographical reach widened further with commissions in Gibraltar in 1889, Istanbul in 1893, Jerusalem in 1896 (The Patriarch of Jerusalem made them Knights of the Order of the Holy Grave), and Rome in 1897, in addition to instruments built in Habsburg Crown Lands, Germany, and Russia. A branch of the firm was set up in Budapest in 1890.

The brothers were appointed organ suppliers to the Imperial Court of Austria-Hungary by the Emperor Franz Joseph I of Austria in 1896, which entitled them to bear the imperial eagle; this necessitated extensive enquiries, investigations, and inspections of the firm, which was comprehensively documented. Rieger was awarded the Austrian coat of arms by the Federal Republic in 1889, and the brothers were made Knights of the Franz-Joseph Order in 1899. The firm employed approximately 200 workers by 1900.

The use of pneumatic and electric actions were introduced during this period, as the specifications and voicing became determined by the tonal and musical ideals of the romantic period. Innovations by Gustav Rieger included combined registers — using "extension" to get two stops out of one rank — and free stop-combination based on a mechanical action (used on the 1890 concert organ at the Deutsches Haus, Brno). There were 1072 organs on the firm's opus-list by the end of 1903, which saw the death of Otto and the end of an era.

=== Otto Rieger and Josef von Glatter-Götz ===
Otto Rieger (21 May 1880 – 28 March 1920) was the son of Otto Rieger (and grandson of Franz Rieger), and took over the firm after his father's death. Under his superintendence, over 1000 more organs were built. He introduced an Art Nouveau style for the organ cases, and adopted the ideals of organ design promulgated by Albert Schweitzer.

He participated in the organ-building working committee at the 1909 Third Congress of the International Society of Music in Vienna which drew up a directive for the building of organs; the result was a decisive recommendation to move away from the late-romantic orchestral organ and towards the use of the slider chests and mechanical action typical of the classical traditions of organ-building, familiar from the many surviving baroque instruments.

After World War I, Rieger, which had been in Austria, found itself in the new Czech state. During this time of adjustment as the established markets of the Danube Monarchy adapted to the newly created states, Otto Rieger died, leaving behind his wife and two daughters. Without a suitable heir, the company struggled.

Otto's school friend, Josef von Glatter-Götz (17 November 1880 – 23 February 1948) had been taken on by Otto as works manager in 1918. He was an engineer and former officer to the Imperial General Staff; he completed an apprenticeship in organ building, and took over the running of the firm seven weeks after his friend's death. He bought the firm in 1924, and by the next year, the 100 employees of the firm were able to resume full-time organ building. A new branch of the firm was established at Mocker, Germany, in 1926.

Josef von Glatter-Götz began a new family tradition with his sons Egon (24 June 1911 – 8 September 1940) and Josef (15 December 1914 – 1 May 1989). They served their apprenticeships with their father and studied at technical colleges in Breslau and Berlin; they were made partners in 1936. The rebuilt firm was again a success; in the year 1938/1939, the Jägerndorf factory accounted for 66% of all organ exports from the German Reich.

Egon von Glatter-Götz took a particular interest in the tonal and artistic design of the organs, while his brother Josef von Glatter-Götz focused on the technical aspects of organ building. During this time, both Romantic organs and classical instruments were built, influenced by the organ reform movement. Commissions came from all over the world, including the Baltic States, Finland, Scandinavia, South America, South Africa, China, and Jerusalem.

The new-found success came to an end with the beginning of World War II. Egon was killed in the first Polish Campaign, on 8 September 1940. Organ-building was forbidden by decree from 1943 to 1945, while the factory was ordered to build munition crates to contribute to the war effort.

=== After World War II ===
After the end of the war in 1945, the firm was appropriated as German property by the Czech government as a consequence of an Beneš decrees by president Edvard Beneš. The owners and workers of Rieger were expelled to Germany, having been dispossessed of their workshop and property, which were merged with the workshop of Josef Kloss and nationalized in 1948 to become Rieger-Kloss. An organ-building company under this name now operates under private ownership in the Czech Republic.

Before the war, the long-established organ-building firm of Vorarlberg, owned by Anton Behmann, had suggested that they enter into business with Rieger. With the renewal of the offer, Josef von Glatter-Götz father and son, together with some workers and their families from the firm, established a new workshop at Schwarzach, Vorarlberg under the name "Rieger Orgelbau" in 1946. They rented Behmann's workshop, and lived in a camp in war service huts on an old shooting range.

In the difficult post-war years they were commissioned to undertake some organ restorations, but under hard circumstances also made handlooms and window frames, and ran a public sauna in order to make a living; Josef Glatter-Götz Jr., worked as a masseur. Progress came in 1950, when they were able to exhibit and sell a 6-stop positiv organ at the World Exhibition in Chicago.

Like his Rieger brother predecessors, Josef Glatter-Götz Jr. developed a new series of small organs. These were technical masterpieces and their popularity led to a renewed reputation and prosperity for the firm. Josef Jr. took full control of the firm after the death of his father in 1948. Under his direction, the firm returned decisively to the principles and traditions of the classical organ-building craft which had begun earlier in the century, while adding the modern benefits of advanced technology, tone, and design. More commissions came in from Germany, the United States, and Austria, and soon the workshops were too small.

=== Caspar, Raimund and Christoph Glatter-Götz ===
A new workshop, 2000 square metres in area and fourteen metres high, was opened in 1972 to cope with the expansion of activities. Josef Glatter-Götz, Jr.'s three sons Caspar (born 1 March 1945), Raimund (born 1 January 1948), and Christoph (born 9 December 1951) followed him into the family business.

Caspar served as apprentice in the Rieger workshop, and worked for Kern, von Beckerath and Kuhn as a journeyman. He returned to Rieger as works manager, a post he held until the end of 1992 when he left to take over at Orgelbau Egbert Pfaff at Owingen, in Germany.

Raimund studied interior and industrial design at the Academy of Applied Arts in Vienna, following which he trained as an organ builder with the Bonn workshop of Johannes Klais. He returned to Rieger as a freelance organ designer in 1977.

Christoph learnt organ building with the Danish firm Marcussen & Søn. He returned to Rieger in 1977 to become managing director, a post he held until his retirement in 2003.

Josef Glatter-Götz Jr. retired in 1984 and died on 1 May 1989, acknowledged as one of the 20th century's most influential organ-builders, especially in regard to the reestablishment of the classical organ-building traditions, which he pioneered and perfected.

=== Wendelin Eberle ===
Wendelin Eberle (born 8 July 1963) began his apprenticeship in organ building with Rieger in 1978. He worked on the technical aspects of organ design, as well as in voicing and tuning, and became manager of the Rieger design office. He took over as works manager of Rieger in 1992, and became president and owner of Rieger-Orgelbau GmbH on 1 October 2003, in a similar sequence to that of Josef von Glatter-Götz eighty years earlier.

== Today ==
Rieger employs approximately 40 people; two groups of ten employees each build the organs from the planning stage through to the point where the finished instrument is resting in its final home. The voicer is involved from the design decisions regarding specification and placement onwards and determines the scales of the pipes, as it is the voicer who has the final responsibility for the quality of sound they produce in the finished organ.

The suppliers of materials – the pipe shop, the locksmith shop, and the workshops for production of manuals and action parts – are located on the same premises as the builders, to allow for complete control over the quality of every part of their organs. Rieger has a long-standing interest in social justice, having been one of the first employers to give their employees health insurance and electric lighting in their accommodation in the opening years of the twentieth century. Manufacture of action parts for their organs is now undertaken mainly by handicapped people.

In their organ design and manufacture, they do not aim to copy any specific style, but rather create a new tradition which allows the interpretation of the full range of organ repertoire. Study of organs of all periods informs this design philosophy, with the result that the resulting sound is not "authentic", but rather serves the music effectively. They write: "In any case it is our goal to build instruments not as much for the past, as certainly for the present and the future."

== Notable Rieger organs ==
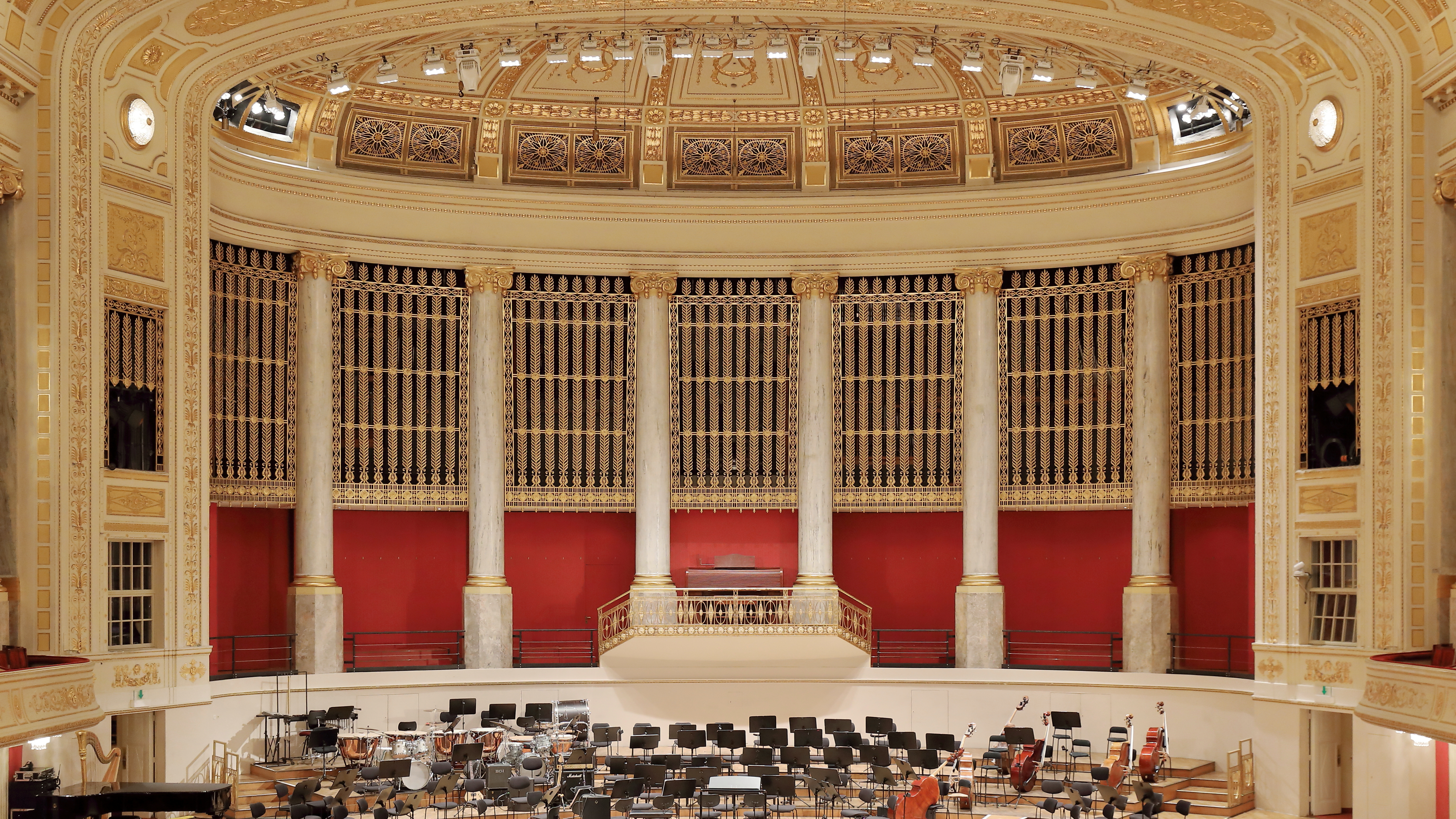
Vienna Konzerthaus

- St. Bedrich, Bedrichov, 1870
- St. Paul, Christiania, 1877
- Olomouc Cathedral, 1885
- Stadtsaal, Innsbruck, 1891
- Braga, Portugal, 1898
- St Pölten Cathedral, St Pölten, 1902
- London College of Music, 1906
- Musikvereinssaal, Vienna, 1907
- Matthias Church, Budapest, 1908
- Musikvereinssaal, Klagenfurt, 1911
- Vienna Konzerthaus, 1913
- Târgu Mures, Kulturpalast, 1913
- Mozarteum concert hall, Salzburg, 1914
- St. Matthew's Church, Łódź, 1928
- Cathedral (Viipuri), Viipuri, 1929
- St. Jakob, Innsbruck, 1931
- Rudolfinum, Prague, 1940
- Neanderkirche, Düsseldorf, 1966
- Marienstatt Abbey, Streithausen, 1969
- International Christian University Chapel, Tokyo, 1970
- Clifton Cathedral, Clifton, Bristol, United Kingdom, c.1973
- Augustinerkirche, Vienna, 1976
- Ratzeburg Cathedral, 1977
- Christ Church Cathedral, Oxford, 1979
- Pacific Union College, Angwin, California, 1968
- Suntory Hall, Tokyo, 1986
- Church of the Holy Trinity (Episcopal), New York City, New York, 1987
- St Marylebone Parish Church, London, 1987
- Hong Kong Cultural Centre, Hong Kong, 1989
- St. Catherine's Church, Frankfurt, 1990
- Stephansdom, Vienna, 1991
- Conservatoire National Supérieur de Musique et de Danse, Paris, 1991
- St. Giles' Cathedral, Edinburgh, 1992
- University of South Africa, Pretoria, 1995
- Christchurch Town Hall, New Zealand, 1997 NZOrgan
- Scots' Church, Melbourne, 1998
- Lillehammer Kirke, 2001
- Bryn Mawr Presbyterian Church, Bryn Mawr, Pennsylvania, 2005
- Dom St. Peter, Regensburg, 2009
- Musikvereinssaal, Vienna, 2011
- Philharmonie de Paris, 2015
- Lotte Concert Hall, Seoul, 2016
- Beomeo Cathedral, Daegu, South Korea, 2017
- Biserica „Sfântul Anton de Padova” din Arad, 1911
- Helsinki Music Centre, 2024

== Bibliography ==
- Orgel-Katalog: Gebrüder Rieger: Orgel- und Harmoniumfabrik (Jägerndorf, 1888)
- Orgelbauanstalten Gebrüder Rieger (Jägerndorf, 1938)
- R. Quoika: Die Jägerndorfer Orgelbauer Rieger und ihr Haus, in Jägerndorfer Heimatbrief XIX (1967)
- C. Glatter-Götz: Rieger Orgelbau (Schwarzach, 1995)
- Alfred Reichling: "Rieger", Grove Music Online ed. L. Macy (Accessed 2007-06-28), http://www.grovemusic.com/
