= Das Orchester =

German music magazine

- Categories: Classical music
- Frequency: 11 per year
- Founded: 1953
- Company: Schott Music
- Country: German
- Based in: Berlin
- Language: German
- Website: dasorchester.de
- ISSN: 0030-4468

Das Orchester is a German-language magazine for musicians and management which has been published eleven times a year since 1953 by Schott Music and is distributed in over 45 countries worldwide. The editor-in-chief is based in Berlin while the publishing house's editorial office is located in Mainz.

== Content ==
The magazine deals with all topics concerning the orchestra: with music education and professional life, with music and music medicine, with music education and training programmes, audience acquisition and cultural financing, orchestra marketing and orchestra management. It takes a look at the international orchestra landscape, reports on the work of Rundfunkchor and publishes studies on audience research. Reports on concert series, music theatre premieres, music festivals, competitions and symposia reflect current musical life. In addition, there is information about new things for musicians, also in instrument making, short news items and detailed reviews of new books, sheet music, CDs and DVDs.

== Musician job market ==
A large part of the magazine is made up of the world's largest musicians' job market, in which almost all German orchestras and radio choirs, European, but also international orchestras and choirs advertise their vacancies and auditions. The job market has been online since 2011.
