= München Olympiastadion station =

Railway station in Munich, Germany

Coordinates: 48°10′56″N 11°32′20″E

München Olympiastadion
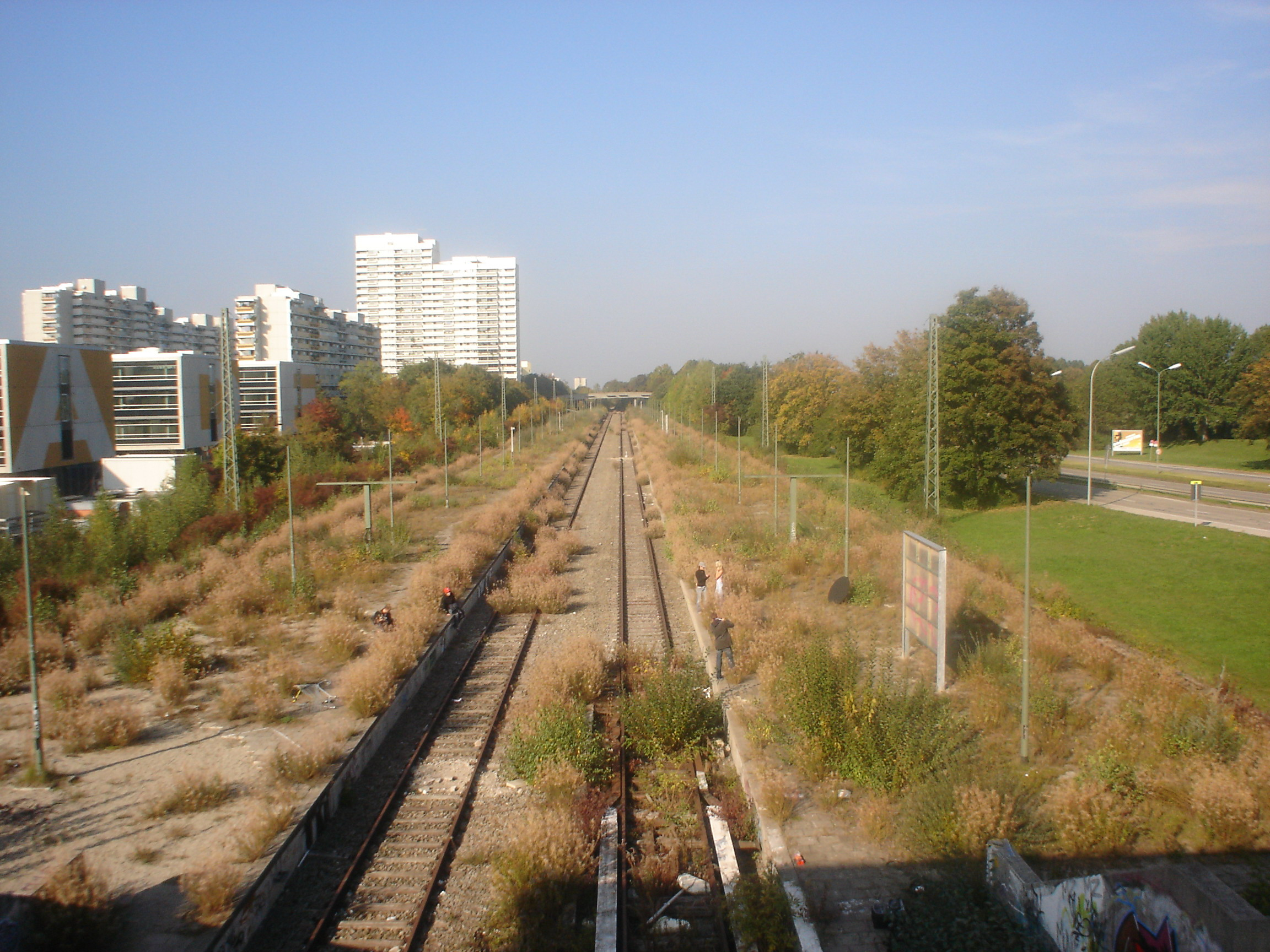
- View from Pressestadt overlooking the platform, October 2006

General information
- Location: Munich, Bavaria; Germany
- Line: Munich North Ring

Other information
- Station code: n/a
- DS100 code: MOLY

History
- Opened: 26 May 1972
- Closed: 8 July 1988

Key dates
- 2003: Tracks disconnected
Location

München Olympiastadion is a former stop on the Munich S-Bahn. The station was built in the early 1970s and opened on 26 May 1972 to provide additional means of transportation for the 1972 Summer Olympics.

The station was used frequently during the 1972 Olympics. While regular services ceased visiting the station after the games ended, it was used sporadically when football matches took place in the nearby Olympic Stadium. Between 8 August 1984 and 8 July 1988, S8 and S11 services stopped at the station when events were taking place at the stadium. The station was officially closed in 1988 and the tracks leading to the station were removed in 2003.

The station consisted of two island platforms with four tracks in total. Two of them terminated at the station, and the remaining two continued further south. Access was provided by the Northern Ring, a normally freight-only railway line. During the Olympics, trains arrived from the west from Allach and Moosach as well as from Johanneskirchen in the east. Later, the station was used in one way operation, with trains arriving from the western route and departing to the east.

The station was officially closed on 8 July 1988 after the final of the 1988 UEFA European Football Championship, and has fallen into disrepair. The tracks were disconnected in 2003 to permit easier excavation of the tunnel for the U3 extension of the Munich U-Bahn. The Transrapid line connecting Munich's central station and the airport was planned to use the former S-Bahn and freight train right-of-way leading to this station. It would have emerged from the tunnel approximately 500 meters south of the station, near the Borstei. However, the line was abandoned due to increased costs.
