= Altstadt (Munich) =

Old town of Munich, Germany

Coordinates: 48.138°N 11.574°E

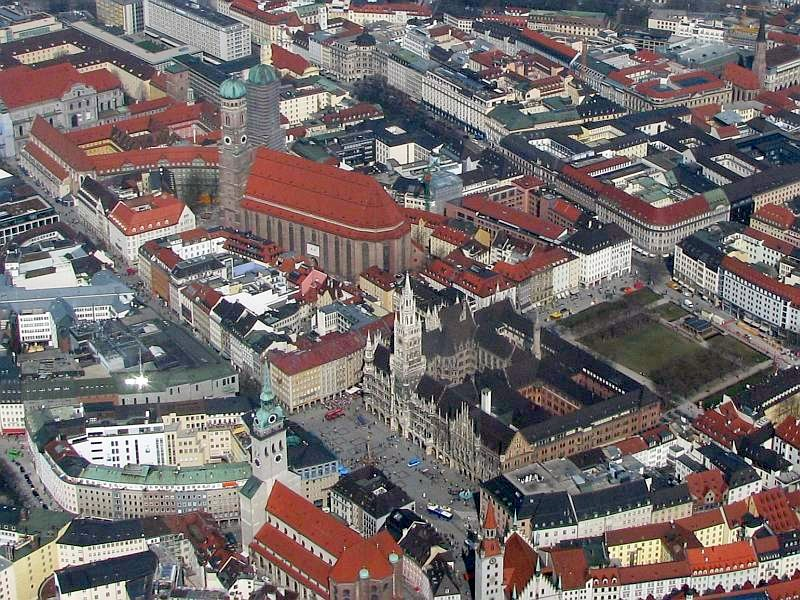
Center of Munich's Old Town with the Marienplatz, Old and New Town Hall, St. Peter and the Frauenkirche

The Munich Old Town (German: Altstadt, pronounced [ˈaltˌʃtat]) is part of the Bavarian capital Munich and has belonged to the city the longest, even if some places which are meanwhile districts of Munich, were mentioned long before Munich's documents spoke of the Old Town. The Old Town forms together with the district Lehel, the municipality No. 1 Altstadt-Lehel. The entire area of the Old Town is listed as both a historical ensemble as well as a historical monument listed in the Bavarian historical monument list.

== Location ==
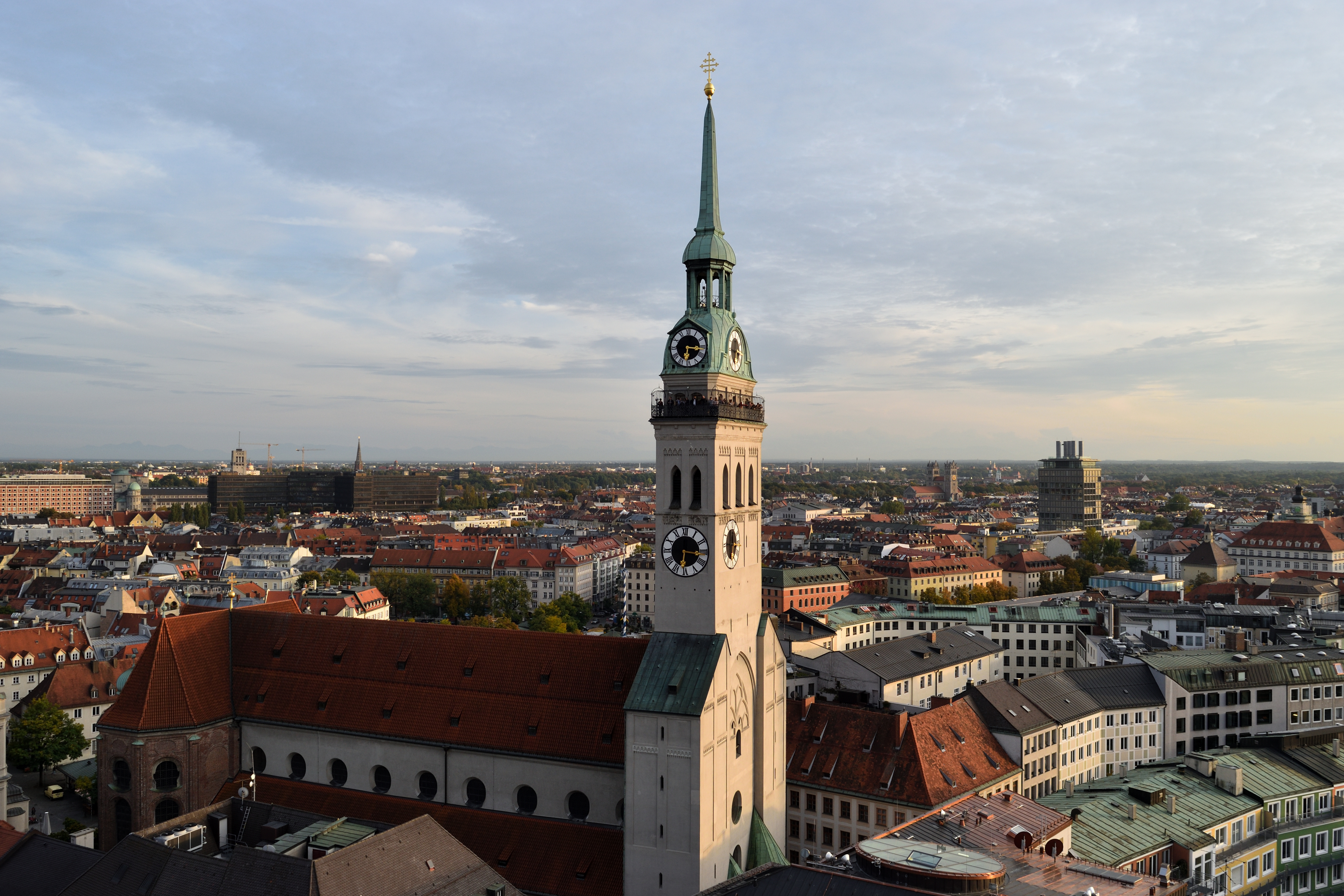
View from the New Town Hall to St. Peter's Church

Munich's old town district essentially corresponds to the area of Munich's historic city center, the area that was surrounded by Munich's city fortifications since the Middle Ages to the end of the 18th century. It is located on two plateau levels of the Munich gravel plain, the Hirschauterrasse, which formed the original floodbed of the Isar, and Old Town plateau located only a few meters higher on which the original city was founded. The sloping edge runs along the west side of Oberanger, Rosental, Viktualienmarkt, Sparkassenstraße and Marstallplatz and separates the upper from the lower Hofgarten (courtyard garden).

The border of the Old Town is essentially formed by the Altstadtring. Exceptions are in the north course Galeriestraße – Odeonsplatz – Brienner Straße within the Altstadtring and in the southeast of the route Müllerstraße – Rumfordstraße outside the Altstadtring. The Old Town borders on four districts, which originally represented the continuation of the historic quarters outside the city wall: northeast is Lehel, formerly called St. Anna suburb or outer Graggenauer district, in the southeast is Isarvorstadt, formerly called outer Angerviertel (Anger quarter), in the Southwest is Ludwigsvorstadt, formerly called outer Hackenviertel, and in the northwest the Maxvorstadt, formerly called outer Kreuzviertel.

== Name ==
"Old Town" is not a historical place name to distinguish it from a new town in Munich – as in Landshut or Straubing. Descriptively, the term has been used since the 19th century to distinguish the historic center, that within the original city walls of the newly created suburbs.

As a toponym, the name was first used after the Second World War, which came along with the introduction of the district committees and the search for names for the various Munich municipalities, which was to additionally label each municipality numerically to complement the names. The name was officially decided in 1954, by the Munich City Council, as Altstadt-Nord for the merger of the former municipalities 1 and 4 as well as Altstadt-Süd for the merger of the former municipalities 2 and 3.

== History ==
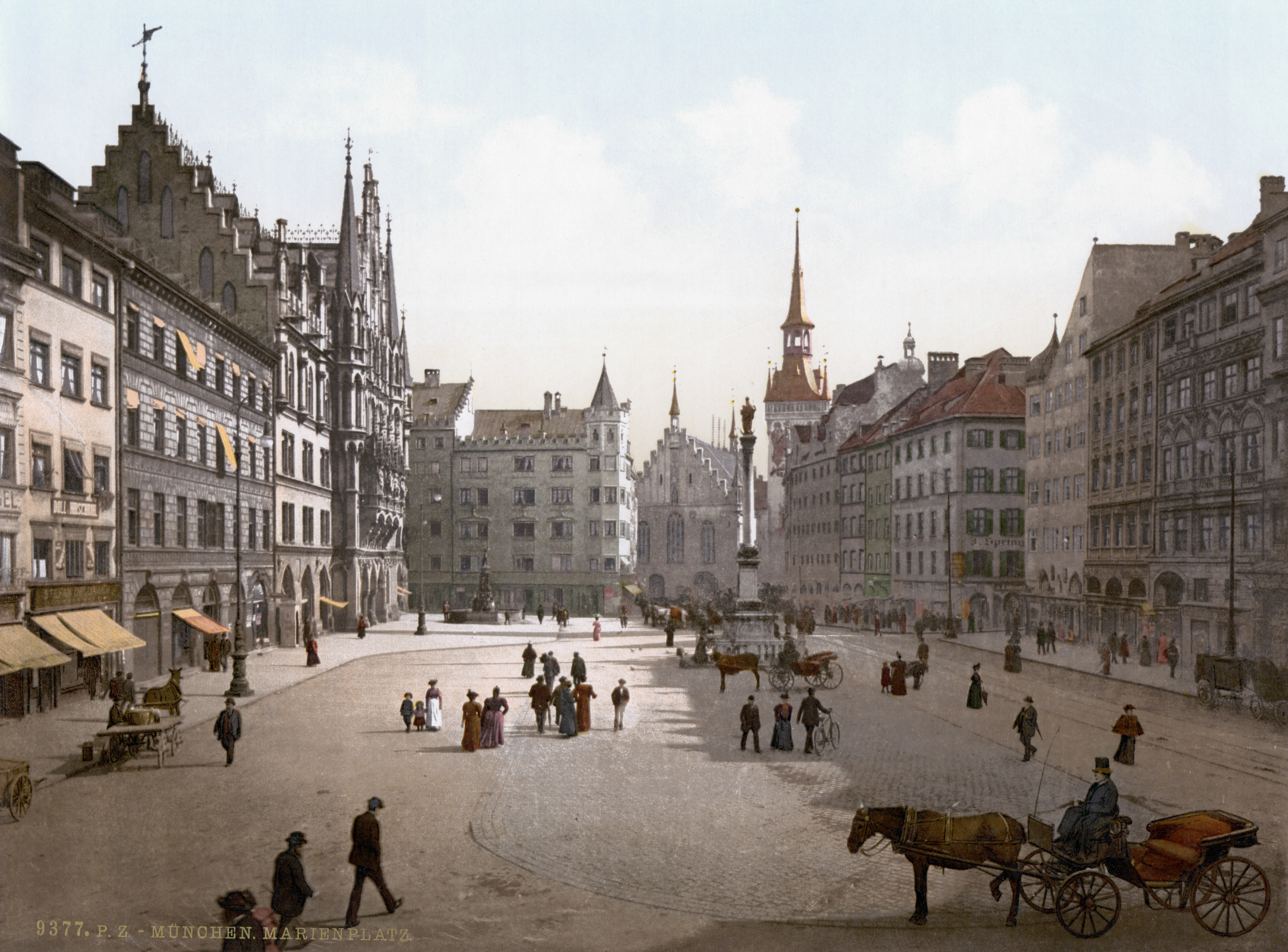
Marienplatz in the 1890s

In the center of the Old Town is the Marienplatz which is where the traditional history of Munich began with the founding of a market on 14 June 1158 in Augsburger Schied (arbitration) by Henry the Lion. Until the end of the 18th century, Munich's history was essentially a history of the city (the present-day Old Town), while Münchner Burgfrieden (castle precinct) outside Munich's city fortifications played a subordinate role. In 1255, Munich became the residence of the Wittelsbach Familie, 1506 it became the capital of reunified Bavaria, and in 1806 it became the capital of the Kingdom of Bavaria. The role as a residential city shaped the history and cityscape of Munich's Old Town, the citizens could emancipate itself against the ducal city rule only gradually. Therefore, the Old Town dominated the Munich Residenz to the north, the Theatinerkirche and the National Theater dominated the cityscape. The New Town Hall on Marienplatz, a demonstration of urban independence, dates back to the end of the 19th century.

The area of the Old Town was largely destroyed during the Second World War. Reconstruction was carried out with extensive preservation of the medieval streets and most of the cityscape influential large buildings such as the churches, the residences, the National Theater, the Alter Hof (Old Court), the city gates, to the state as they were before the war, and the Old and New Town Hall. The bourgeois buildings of the Old Town of Munich, as documented by the photographs of Georg Pettendorfer, were largely lost. Major changes in the streets were mainly the clearing out of the Marienhof (courtyard) and the breakthrough from the cattle market to the south, which created large squares instead of the original narrow streets. Another intervention in the building structure and the character of the Old Town was the construction of the Altstadtring in the 1960s. Through the construction of a pedestrian zone in 1972, the through traffic was directed out of the Old Town.

== Subdivisions ==
The first city map of Munich by Tobias Volckmer, 1613, clearly show the inner city as a semi-oval and the surrounding outer city with the wedge-shaped depictions of a valley town and the crossing main city axes at the western end of Marienplatz.

A first subdivision of the city was in 1271 by the division of the parish of St. Peter along the east–west axis of the city (the salt road) and the promotion of the Frauenkirche as the second parish church. Although this was primarily a church subdivision, it was also used in secular documents to designate the northern and southern halves of the city, and even the outside of the city, as St. Mariae and St. Peter.

In 1300, for the first time, a subdivision into an inner and an outer city was documented. The inner city being used to define the part of the city surrounded by the first city wall, which went back to the founding of Henry the Lion and was therefore often referred to in Munich's city history as a "leonic city" or "city of Henry". The outer city described the expansion of the city under Ludwig the Strict and Ludwig the Bavarian, which was surrounded by the still under construction since 1300 second city wall. The border between the inner and outer city ran along the streets of Sparkassenstraße, Viktualienmarkt, Rosental, Färbergraben, Augustinerstraße, Schäfflerstraße, Schrammerstraße and Hofgraben. This subdivision had no administrative significance. There was a social gradient between the two cities, although the inner city was not populated by patricians, as it was occasionally shown. The division into inner and outer city was combined with the parish division, so for example, the southern half of the inner city is also called "inner city of Peter".

More important than the distinction between the inner and outer city was, the still existing division of the Old Town into districts in the Middle Ages, which were separated by the main traffic axes of Munich. The districts are mentioned for the first time in a document dating back to 21 January 1363 under their Latin names: "quarta fori pecorum" (quarter of the cattle market, Rindermarktviertel) "quarta secunda ad gradus superioris institarum" (second quarter to the upper Kramen, Kramenviertel), "quarta tercia apud fratres heremitanos" (third quarter with the hermit brothers, Eremitenviertel ), "quarta ultima apud Chunradum Wilbrechtum" (last quarter with the Konrad Wilbrecht, Wilbrechtsviertel). The valley was listed as a separate area and not assigned to the districts. The council protocol of 29 December 1458, designated three of the districts for the first time with today's names: the Hackenviertel, the Kreuzviertel and the Graggenauer Viertel. The first quarter was still called Rindermarktviertel, the name Angerviertel was first mentioned on 15 September 1508, but only used as of 1530 in the Council protocol. The valley was no longer a separate area, but divided into the neighboring districts. The order of listing of the districts remained unchanged from that of the 1363 list.

This division into districts, which is typical of many medieval cities, was initially a military division, which was then extended to public order. The districts were originally led by two captains, three as of 1403, each one from the inner, the outer council and from the community. These captains had to provide for internal security (police, nightwatch, guarding the city walls and gates, fire brigade, order at markets and events such as horse racing) and they directed the military ranks of the Munich citizens. If necessary, the military squad of a district in the field were further subdivided, which were for example called "eight" in 1410. Because of their importance for the police services, the districts were also referred to as police districts in the 19th century.

After the unarming of Munich at the end of the 18th century, the names of the districts were extended to the city portions outside the old city walls, which were referred to as outer Graggenauer-, Anger-, Hacken- and Kreuzviertel. It was not until 1812 that these areas received their own names and were referred to as suburbs: St.-Anna-Vorstadt (today Lehel), Isarvorstadt, Ludwigsvorstadt, Maxvorstadt and Schönfeldvorstadt (today part of Maxvorstadt).

In the division of the urban area into municipal districts, the medieval districts formed the municipal districts 1 to 4. After the Second World War, the districts were given names that had no relation to the historic name except for the Angerviertel. In 1954, the districts 1 and 4 were combined to create the district Altstadt-Nord and the districts 2 and 3 to create the district Altstadt-Süd. In today's district of Altstadt-Lehel, the districts create four of six districts which bear their historic names again. Its external borders are predominantly formed by the Altstadtring and are therefore largely outside the medieval borders.

Name	Location	East / West border	North / south border	District 1363	Name 1363	District-No.	Name 1947
Graggenauer Viertel	Northeast	Weinstraße–Theatinerstraße	Marienplatz–Tal	4.	Wilbrechtsviertel	1	Max-Joseph-Platz
Angerviertel	Southeast	Rosenstraße–Sendlinger Straße	Marienplatz–Tal	1.	Rindermarktviertel	2	Angerviertel
Hackenviertel	Southwest	Rosenstraße–Sendlinger Straße	Kaufingerstraße–Neuhauser Straße	2.	Kramenviertel	3	Sendlinger Straße
Kreuzviertel	Northwest	Weinstraße–Theatinerstraße	Kaufingerstraße–Neuhauser Straße	3.	Eremitenviertel	4	City-Bezirk

== Graggenauer Viertel ==
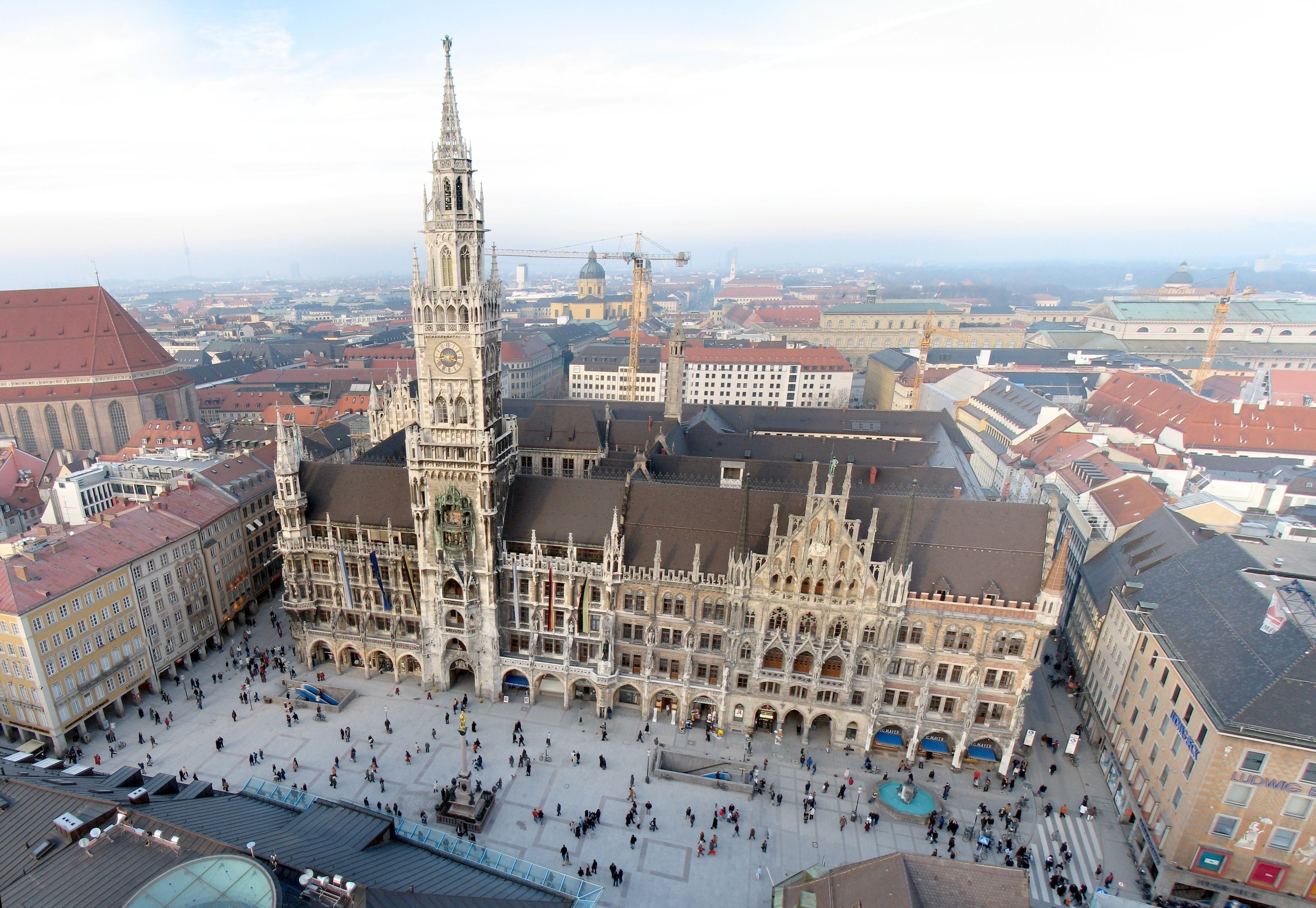
Marienplatz with new Town Hall

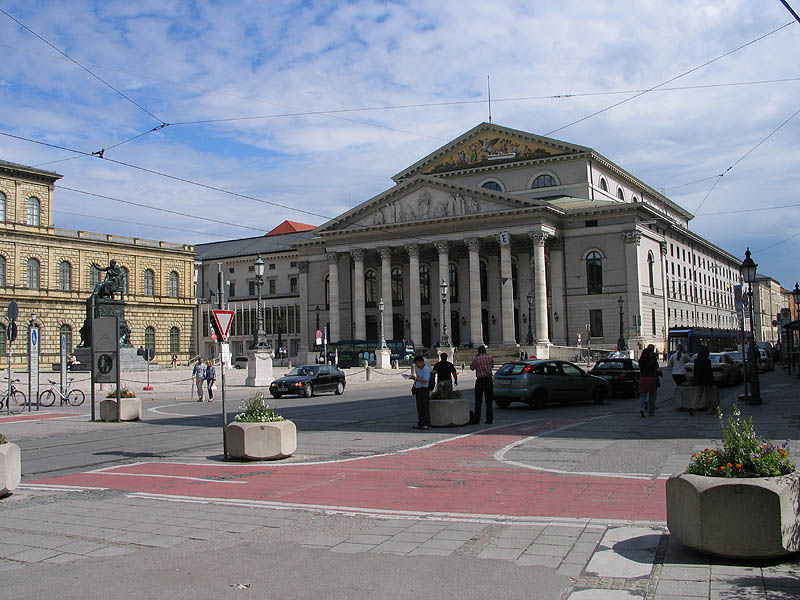
Max-Josephs-Platz

The name of the Graggenauer district is derived from the Graggenau, a ground name mentioned in 1325 as "Grakkaw" and 1326/27 as "Gragkenawe", which has its roots in the word Krack, which means raven, crow. The Graggenauer Viertel was the only one, which was named after its captain with its first documentary mention as Wilbrechtsviertel. It was called 1420/21 the Hansens Barts Viertel, 1433 the Scharfzahns Viertel, and again in 1439 the Wilbrechts Viertel after the captains at the time. The other districts were also named after their captains at times. Together with the Kreuzviertel, the Graggenauer Viertel formed the area of the Frauenpfarrei (women's parish) in the Middle Ages and, from 1954, the district of Altstadt Nord.

The Graggenauer Viertel is dominated by the ducal buildings of the old court and the Municher residence, which together with buildings located between them and also assigned to the court service buildings, for example, the Old Marstall (Alte Münze), the ducal arsenals and the Hofpfisterei, which divided the district into two halves, one area on the Old Town terrace and one area in the valley. The area north of the Marienplatz was first inhabited by the court service, later also by wealthy citizens. The area lying in the valley was predominantly the location of craft and trade enterprises. The Franciscan Monastery on today's Max-Joseph-Platz, the Pütrich Regelhaus (also: Pütrich Seelhaus) and the Ridler Seelhaus formed the spiritual focus of the district.

The bourgeois Munich was represented by the Old Town Hall in this district since the Middle Ages. In the 19th century, the houses north of the Marienplatz had to give way to the construction of the New Town Hall. Because of its proximity to the courtyard, the Graggenauer Viertel was particularly popular for travelers. Today, the Platzl with the Hofbräuhaus form the main tourist attraction. With the Maximilianstraße, the Residenzstraße and the east side of the Theatinerstraße most of the prestigious shopping streets are also located in this district. North of the New Town Hall is the Marienhof. This area and its residential buildings were destroyed during the Second World War by US bombing raids. Meanwhile, used as a parking lot, the Marienhof was never rebuilt. Instead, today it is the location of the largest green area of the old town.

== Angerviertel ==
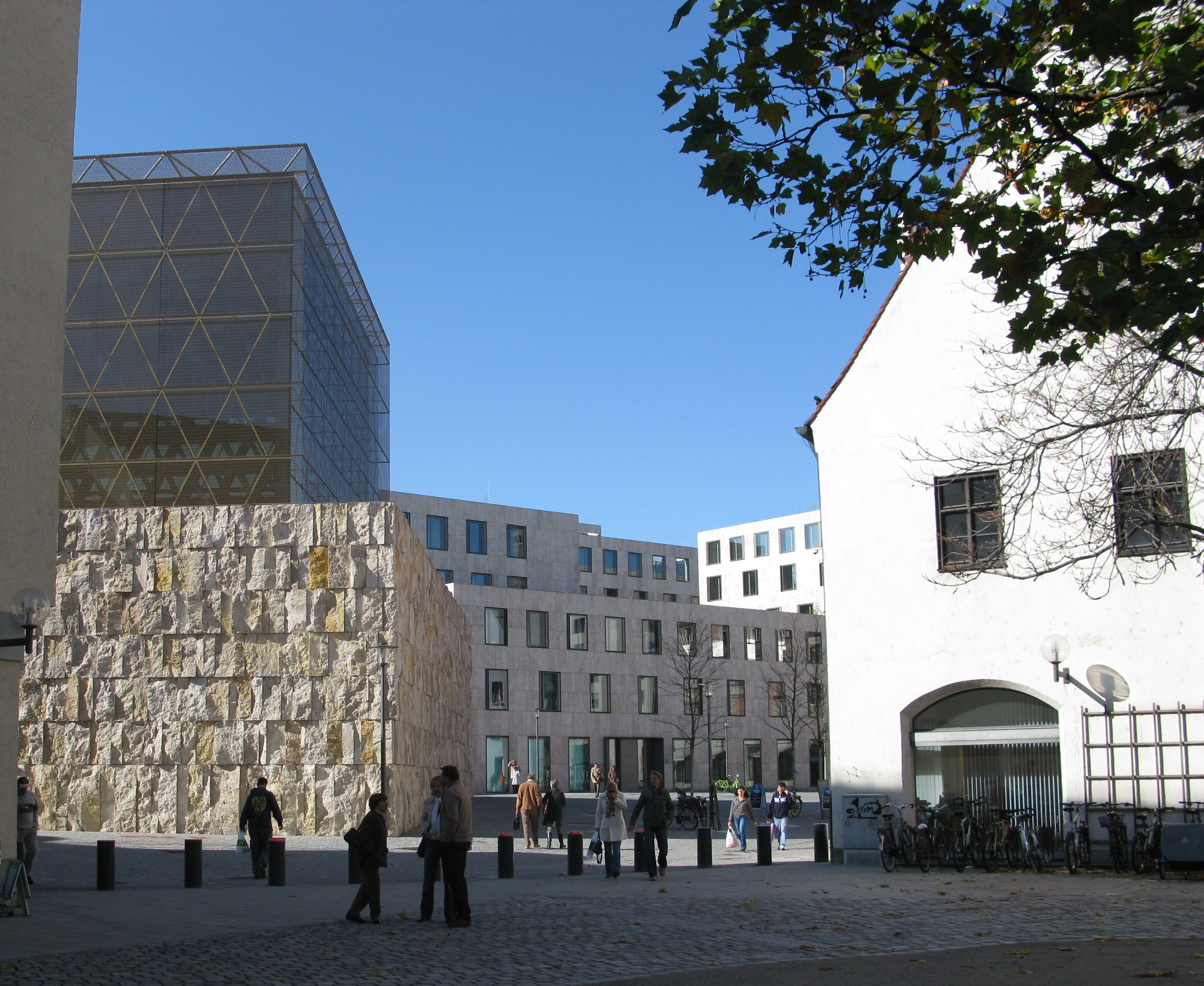
St. Jakobsplatz

The Angerviertel takes its name from an Anger, an open space that was originally in the area of today's St. Jakobsplatz. It is the last district that was given its present name. The original name "Rindermarktviertel" came from the former cattle market, to which the Rindermarktbrunnen (cattle market fountain) of sculptor Josef Henselmann from the year 1964 and the street name Rindermarkt are reminders of today. According to captains of the district, it was called the Hans Pütrich Viertel in 1420/21 and Rudolf's Viertel in 1445. In 1487, the name am Anger ... zu München was notarized in a deed in Munich. Together with the Hackenviertel, the Angerviertel in the Middle Ages formed the area of St. Peter's parish, but the area of the Heilig-Geist-Spital (Holy Spirit Hospital) formed its own parish with the Heilig-Geist-Kirche (Holy Spirit Church) as a parish church and its own cemetery. From 1954 the two districts formed to become the district Altstadt Süd.

The Angerviertel is shaped like a hook. In the middle, the Petersbergl lies on the old town terrace, followed by the east and south each a narrow strip on the Hirschauterrasse, which was traversed by the city streams.

In the Angerviertel were mainly retail and craftsmen resident, who used the water power of the city streams for their operations.

== Hackenviertel ==
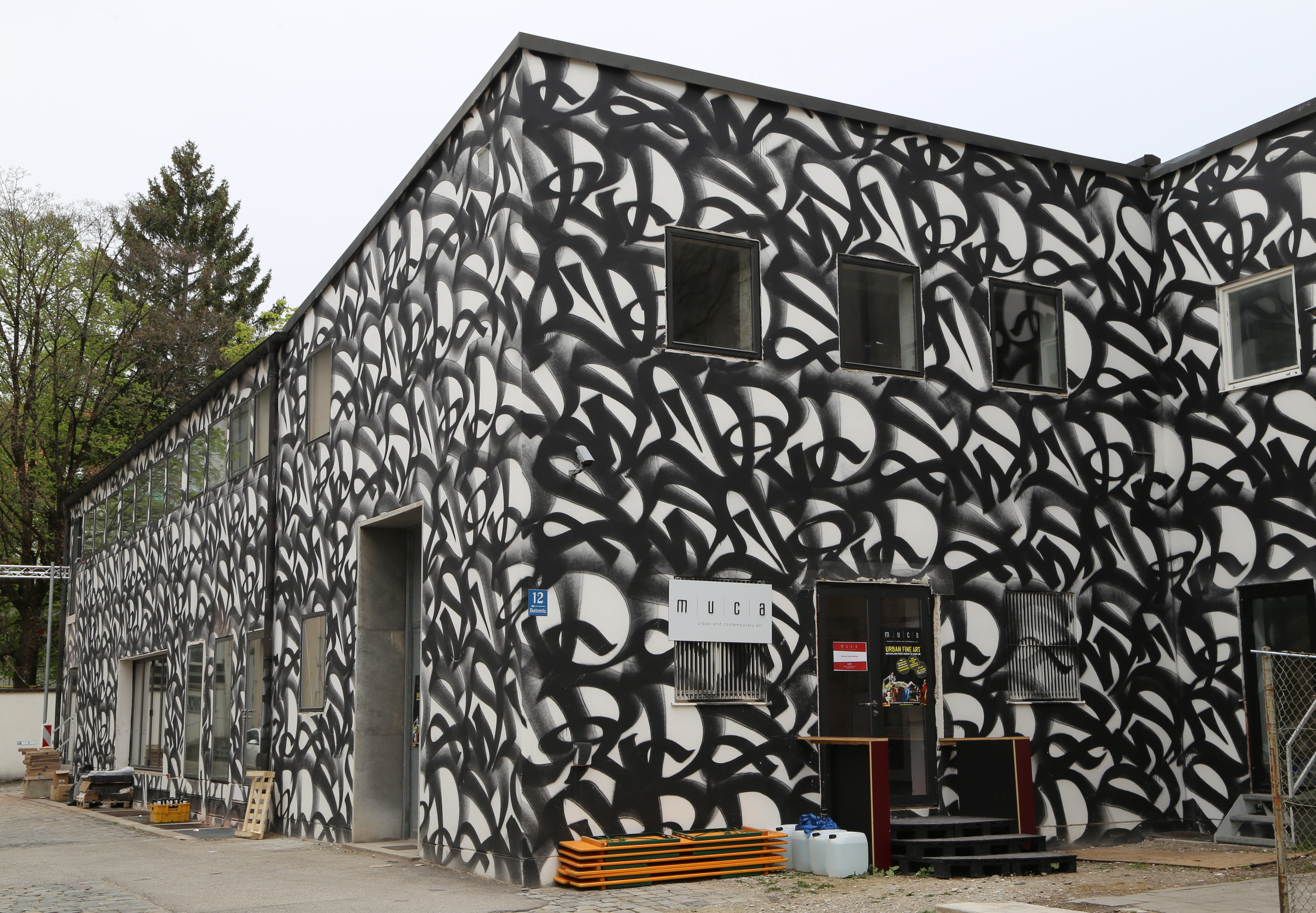
Museum of Urban and Contemporary Art

The Hackenviertel is named after a ground designation in dem Haggen, which was first mentioned in 1326 and in which today is limited to the streets Altheimer Eck (Altheimer corner), Hotterstraße, Hackenstraße, Brunnstraße and Damenstiftstraße. Derived from this ground designation of Hag, a fenced off terrain. In the Hackenviertel at Altheimer Eck was the settlement Altheim which was incorporated into the city area by the inclusion in the second city wall ring and is still noticeable today by the curving course of the road at the two east–west connections.

The origin of the original name Kramenviertel (junk district) first mention 1363 is unclear, since the upper Kramen (Kramläden) were on the south side of the Marienplatzes, therefore lying in the Angerviertel. The referral was probably associated to the Kramläden (junk store) on the south side of Kaufingerstraße. After the district captains of the Schrenck family it was called the Lorenz Schrencken Viertel in 1420/21 and simply the Schrencken Viertel in 1445. Together with the Angerviertel, the Hackenviertel formed the area of St. Peter's parish in the Middle Ages, here was also the cemetery of the parish and the former cemetery church, today's Kreuzkirche, (Church of All Saints on the cross). From 1954 the two districts formed the district Altstadt Süd.

In Hackenviertel were mainly retail citizens resident. There were only a few noble palaces here, and the sister monasteries of the Salesian Sisters (later the St.-Anna-Damenstift) and the Servites were not particularly noticeable because of their restrained architecture. Until the Second World War, the two large complexes of the Herzogspital (Duke's Hospital) and the Josefspital shaped the appearance of the district.

In 2016, the Museum of Urban and Contemporary Art has been located in Hotterstraße 12. In 2017, on the corner of Oberanger and Dultstrasse, the memorial to lesbians and gays persecuted in the Nazi era was inaugurated.

== Kreuzviertel ==
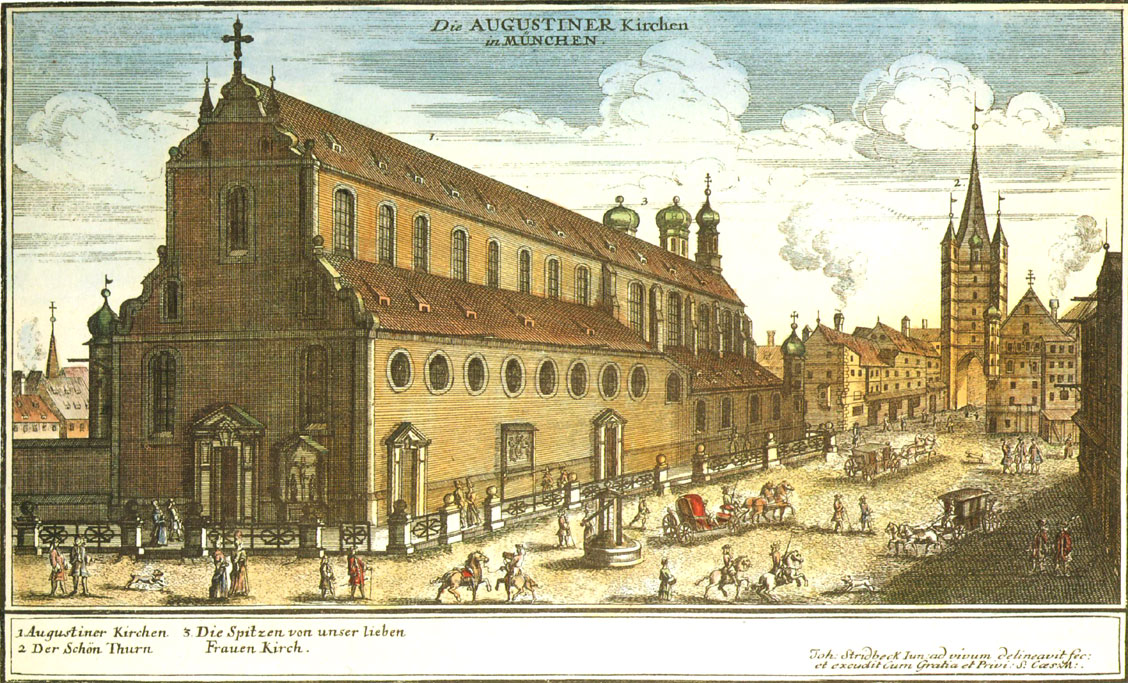
The Augustinian Church, today's German Hunting and Fishing Museum

The Kreuzviertel takes its name from Kreuzgasse, a street that today approximates the Promenadeplatz and Pacellistraße. The origin of the name is unclear, it possibly goes back to a former marker symbol or a cross standing in field. The original name Eremitenviertel refers to the monastery of the Augustinian Hermits, which was in this district since 1294 and of which today only the secularized Augustinian Church is preserved. According to the captains of the district, it was referred to in 1410 as the Katzmair Viertel, 1420/21 as the Franz Tichtls Viertel and in 1445 as the Ligsalz Viertel. Together with the Graggenau district, the Kreuzviertel formed the area of the Frauenpfarrei in the Middle Ages, here lay the cemetery of the parish and the former cemetery church, today's Salvatorkirche. From 1954 the two districts formed the district Altstadt Nord.

In the Middle Ages, the Kreuzviertel was the center of the wealthy bourgeoisie. Here on the site of today's Promenade square stood the Salzstadel, where the salt was stored, to which Munich was responsible for a large part of its prosperity. Here were also the homes of wealthy merchants and patricians. The most outstanding structure of the Middle Ages is the Frauenkirche, which in 1271 had become the second parish in Munich. To it belonged a cemetery on the outer wall of the city with the Salvatorkirche as cemetery church.

From the 16th century, the bourgeois building fabric was pushed back ever further. First, the large building complexes of the Wilhelminischen Veste (Wilhelminian fortress) and the Jesuit monastery with the Church of St. Michael with the Old Academy, today a meditation church. Monasteries of the Carmelites and Carmelite nuns followed and, outside the city walls, the Capuchin Monastery on a bastion of the ramparts, making the Kreuzviertel a spiritual center.

In the 17th and 18th centuries, nobles increasingly acquired land in the Kreuzviertel and erected representative palaces, especially in the area of Promenadeplatz, Prannerstraße and Kardinal-Faulhaber-Straße. At the northern end of the rear Schwabinger Gasse (now Theatinerstraße) emerged the Theatinerkirche as a court church and the adjacent monastery of the Theatines.

In the 19th century, state organizations were concentrated in this area, for example, the state parliament in Prannerstraße, the ministry of the interior in the buildings of the Theatinerkloster, which was dissolved during the secularization, and the foreign ministry with the seat of the prime minister in the Palais Montgelas. At the end of the 19th century, several banks took over old aristocratic palaces and erected monumental bank buildings in their place, for example, the Bayerische Staatsbank (1918) at Kardinal-Faulhaber-Straße 1, the Bayerische Hypotheken- und Wechsel-Bank at Kardinal-Faulhaber-Straße 10 and the Bayerische Vereinsbank at Cardinal-Faulhaber-Straße 14.

== See also ==
- Architecture of Munich
