= Kardinal-Faulhaber-Straße =

Street in Munich, Germany

Coordinates: 48°08′27″N 11°34′28″E

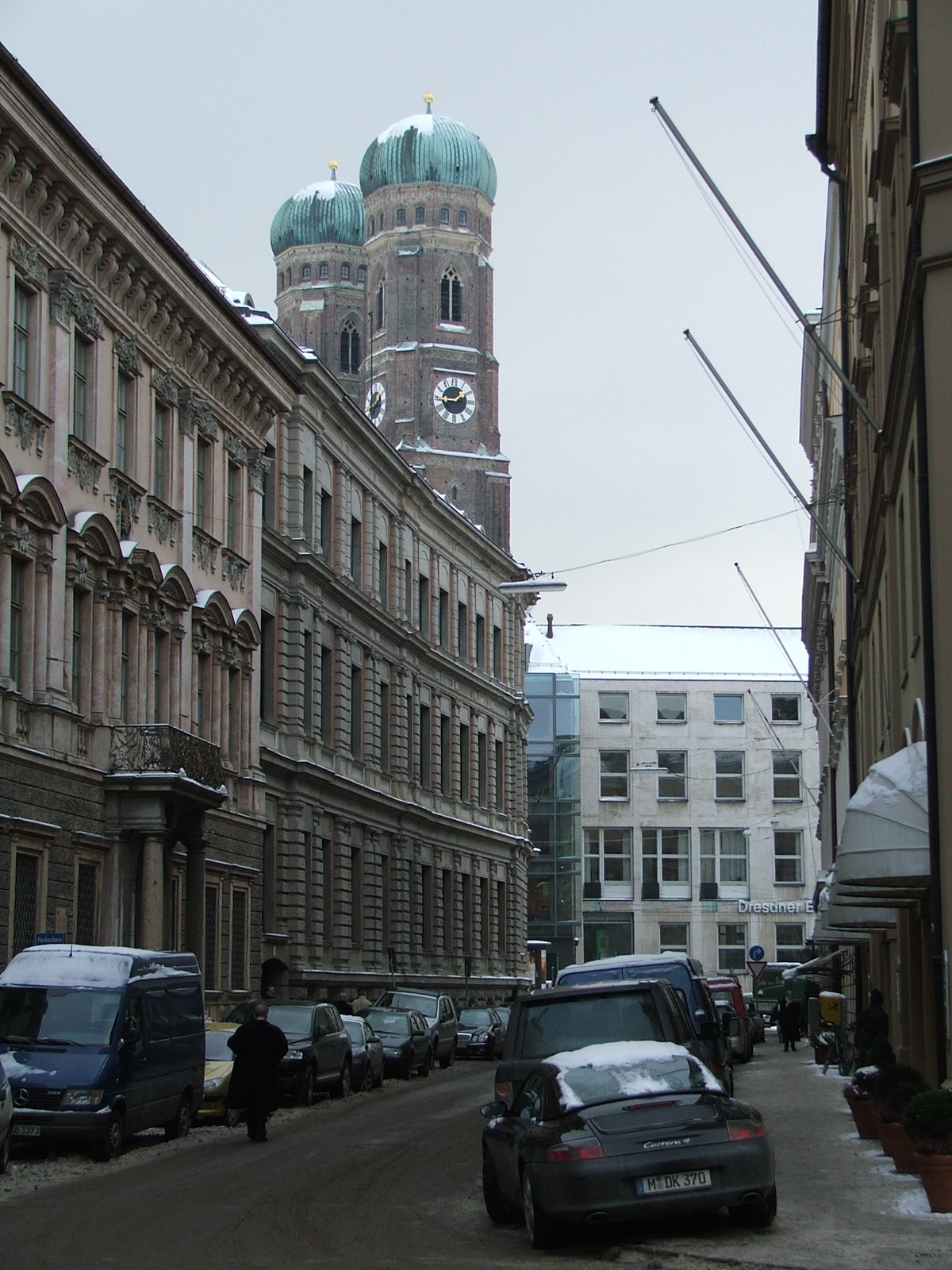
View in the southern direction

The Kardinal-Faulhaber-Straße is a street in the old town of Munich. It runs from Salvatorplatz in a southwesterly direction to Promenadeplatz.

== History ==
The street is in the Kreuzviertel. Its earlier names were Barts Gassen (around 1375) and Graf-Portia-Prangers-Gasse (towards the end of the 18th century). From 1818 it bore the name Promenadegasse. After the death of the Munich Archbishop Michael von Faulhaber (1869-1952) it received its present name in 1952.

== Streetscape ==
The streetscape is dominated by representative designed aristocratic palaces and administrative buildings. Just like the adjacent Prannerstraße and the Promenadeplatz to the south, Kardinal-Faulhaber-Straße was an address for the aristocratic palace concentrated in the Kreuzviertel. The Königliche Filialbank (today: HVB Forum) was built in 1893/94 at the corner of Salvatorstraße. The Spreti Palais was built around 1730. François de Cuvilliés built the Holnstein Palace between 1733 and 1737, contracted by Elector Karl Albrecht for his son Franz Ludwig. Since 1821 it has been the official residence of the Archbishop of Munich and Freising. In 1885/86 an administrative building of the Bayerische Vereinsbank was built, in 1895/96 the west wing of the Bayerische Hypotheken- und Wechsel-Bank. House number 12 refers to the former Palais Porcia.

In front of house no. 8, the Kurt-Eisner monument on the sidewalk commemorates the assassination of the first Bavarian Prime Minister Kurt Eisner on 21 February 1919.
