= HypoVereinsbank =

Bank in Germany, part of UniCredit Group

UniCredit Bank GmbH

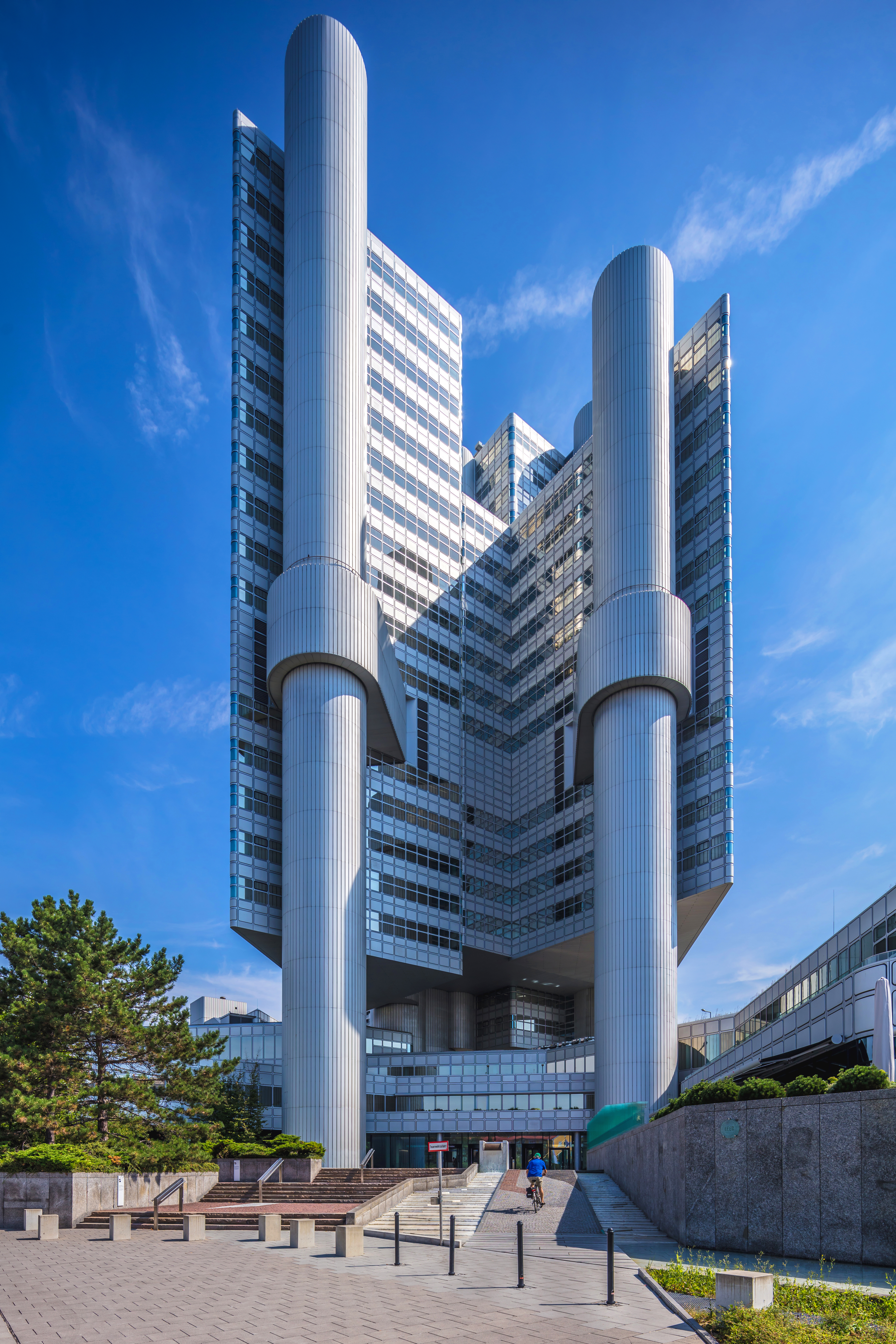
- HVB is headquartered at Hypo-Haus in Munich, completed 1981.
- Trade name: HypoVereinsbank
- Type: Subsidiary
- Industry: Financial services
- Founded: 1780 (Bayerische Staatsbank); 1835 (Hypo-Bank); 1998 (HypoVereinsbank)
- Headquarters: Munich, Germany
- Total assets: €270.4 billion (2025)
- Total equity: 19,0 Bn. Euro (Common Equity Tier 1) (2014)
- Owner: UniCredit
- Number of employees: 12,194 HVB Group (31 December 2019)
- Website: www.hypovereinsbank.de

HypoVereinsbank (HVB), legally registered since late 2008 as UniCredit Bank GmbH, is a significant bank in Germany headquartered in Munich. It has been part of the Milan-based UniCredit group since 2005, and fully owned by it since 2008. As a consequence, HVB is operating exclusively in Germany, where it mainly focuses on private clients business and corporate banking, customer-related capital market activities and wealth management.

HypoVereinsbank's predecessor entities include financial institutions that played major roles in the financial history of Bavaria, including the Bavarian State Bank (1780-1971), Bayerische Hypotheken- und Wechsel-Bank (1835-1998), Bayerische Vereinsbank (1869-1998), and Bayerische Notenbank (1875-1934).

== History ==
=== Stand-alone bank ===
Logo of Vereins- und Westbank

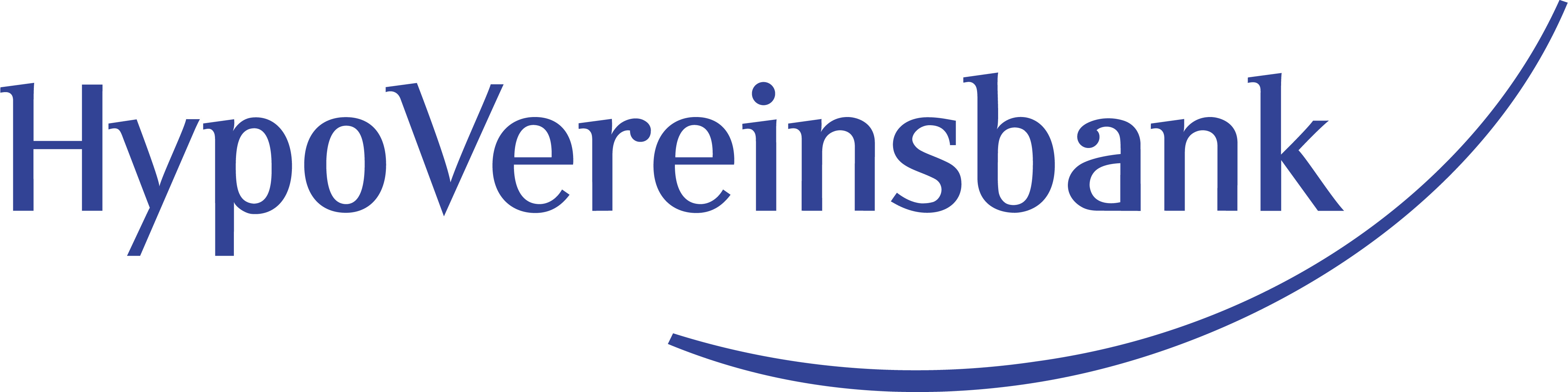
HVB logo following the 1998 merger (used until March 2008)

HVB Group logo used until 2008

HVB Bank logo used by international subsidiaries used until 2008

In 1998, Bayerische Hypotheken- und Wechsel-Bank (also known as Hypo-Bank) and Bayerische Vereinsbank merged to form Bayerische Hypo- und Vereinsbank Aktiengesellschaft, also known as HypoVereinsbank or HVB. The merger was conceived as a defensive move favored by the Bavarian authorities, against the prospect of a hostile takeover of Bayerische Vereinsbank by Deutsche Bank which had been rumored since 1996.

The new heavyweight expanded its network into Central and Eastern Europe. During the period from 2000 to 2002, HVB completed the integration of Vienna-based Bank Austria Creditanstalt (BA-CA) and created HVB Group. Within that Group, BA-CA was responsible for the CEE countries, and bought, amongst others, the Bulgarian bank Biochim, the Serbian Eksimbanka and the Romanian Banca Comerciala Ion Țiriac.

However, the 1998 merger soon turned into a financial debacle. Hypo-Bank had entered it with a large mortgage legacy and had substantial encumbrances stemming, in particular, from the allocation of mortgage loans to the new federal states. HVB CEO Albrecht Schmidt later estimated the real-estate encumbrances to have cropped up "unexpectedly" to around DM 3.5 billion. This was followed by a bitter dispute between HVB and the former CEO of Hypo-Bank, Eberhard Martini, during the course of which Martini lost his position on HVB's Supervisory Board. The public prosecutor of Munich I also initiated preliminary proceedings against Martini and other management board members of the former Hypo-Bank, which were ended in 2001 against the payment of fines. The fine imposed on Martini in this procedure amounted to DM 700,000.

In March 2003, HVB's property financing subsidiary Hypo Real Estate was spun off and floated on the stock market. A minority share in Bank Austria Creditanstalt was also publicly listed.

=== Within UniCredit Group ===
In 2005, an increasingly distressed HVB was taken over by Unicredit. Also in 2005, HVB absorbed Vereins- und Westbank, which had been formed by the 1974 merger of Vereinsbank Hamburg (unrelated to Bayerische Vereinsbank) and Westbank. Vereinsbank Hamburg had been founded in 1856 on the initiative of renowned merchants in Hamburg. Westbank was created in 1943 from a forced merger of several smaller banks in northern Germany. It was initially called "Schleswig-Holsteinische und Westbank", and was renamed "Westbank" in 1968.

In 2006, HVB took over the corporate clients portfolio of Westfalenbank AG, which had been founded in 1921 by leading companies in the Rhineland-Westphalian industrial district on Bochum. There was already a connection between the two institutions since Hypo-Bank had acquired a part of Westfalenbank in 1971.

Also in 2006, HVB sold its overwhelming majority holding in BA-CA to UniCredit for €13 billion, without an auction process. This subsequently led to a number of lawsuits by HVB shareholders. The investment company Activest was sold to a UniCredit fund subsidiary called Pioneer Investments.

In January 2007, UniCredit announced its intention to carry out a squeeze-out of HVB. The price in this respect was established at €38.26 per share. A decision on the squeeze-out was taken at the Shareholders Meeting on 26 June 2007. Following the Shareholders Meeting, over 100 actions to set aside a shareholders' resolution by free HVB shareholders took place; this represents a record for Germany. At the Shareholders Meeting, the Bonn-based lawyer Thomas Heidel was selected as special representative pursuant to § 147 German Stock Corporation Act, who, amongst other things, was to look into possible claims for damages in conjunction with the sale of the Bank Austria shareholding. UniCredit, for its part, lodged an action to set aside a shareholders' resolution in turn. During the subsequent period, the special representative lodged complaints that his work was being obstructed. On 15 September 2008, the squeeze-out adopted by the Shareholders Meeting in June 2007 was entered into the commercial register at the Register of Companies in Munich. As such, all remaining HVB shares were transferred to UniCredit by force of law, and the listing on the stock exchanges was discontinued.

In April 2008, HVB aligned its brand with that of UniCredit Group. The name HypoVereinsbank was retained; however, the previous blue logo was replaced by black lettering preceded by the red UniCredit logo. In a second step, the German parent entity Bayerische Hypo- und Vereinsbank Aktiengesellschaft was renamed UniCredit Bank AG on 15 December 2008 (amongst other reasons, due to a perceived risk of confusion with the troubled Hypo Real Estate), without that affecting the HVB branding strategy.

In August 2014, the company announced the sale of the DAB direct banking subsidiary. BNP Paribas paid €354 million for the 81.4% share in DAB held by HVB.

HypoVereinsbank sold its interest in PlanetHome AG in June 2015. The transfer of the equities was completed on 16 June 2015. Financial investors AP Capital Investments and Deutsche Invest Equity Partners purchased PlanetHome AG and its subsidiaries. Cooperation with PlanetHome shall remain unaffected by the sale of the equities. Since 2016, former subsidiary UniCredit Bank Serbia (formerly HVB Banka Srbija), UniCredit Bank Slovenia (formerly Bank Austria Creditanstalt d.d. Ljubljana), UniCredit Bank Czech Republic and Slovakia (formerly HVB Bank Czech Republic) were directly under UniCredit S.p.A., the parent company of HypoVereinsbank. According to UniCredit CEO Andrea Orcel, HypoVereinsbank lowered its cost-to-income ratio from 55% to 36% over five years, while its return on equity rose sixfold to 24%.

== Operations ==
HVB is a member of the Cash Group. As a mixed mortgage bank, it performs banking operations as a universal bank within the meaning of the Mortgage Banking Act and, as a mortgage bank, is also authorised to issue pfandbriefs.

=== Subsidiaries ===
Important subsidiaries of UniCredit Bank GmbH are:

- Bankhaus Neelmeyer AG, Bremen (private sector bank)
- Unicredit Direct Services GmbH, Munich (Call centre)
- HVB Immobilien AG, Munich (Real estate management)
- Unicredit Leasing GmbH, Hamburg (Leasing company)
- HVB Profil Gesellschaft für Personalmanagement mbH, Munich (Temping agency)
- Wealth Management Capital Holding GmbH

=== Cultural commitment ===
HypoVereinsbank is a member of the Association of Arts and Culture of the German Economy at the Federation of German Industries, and is both initiator and promoter of numerous cultural projects and institutions. Its cultural commitment extends from the work of the Hypo Cultural Foundation, with the Kunsthalle in Munich, right through to the sponsorship of music festivals and international competitions (e.g. Bayreuther Festspiele, Rheingau Musik Festival, Bachfest Leipzig, Richard-Strauss-Festival and the singing competition Competizione dell'Opera). For more than 30 years, the bank has been supporting young artists with its own cultural promotion programme, Jugend kulturell. This includes a series of events throughout Germany, exhibitions in the various genres of the Fine Arts and an annual competition for the Jugend kulturell Award.

Furthermore, HVB hosts the UniCredit Festival Night in Munich's city centre. The annual kick-off event of the Munich Opera Festival presents performances from the world of opera, concert, dance, songs and literature. The UniCredit Festival Night is organised in cooperation with the Bavarian State Opera. The HypoVereinsbank Art Collection also plays an important role in the bank's promotion of culture. At present, it comprises over 20,000 artworks, ranging from antiquity right down to the present day, which are distributed among 600 branch offices around the world. The Collection focuses on older masterpieces (e.g. Leandro Bassano and François Boucher); classical, modern and contemporary art (e.g. Kurt Schwitters, Georg Baselitz and Gerhard Richter), light art (e.g. Dan Flavin) and photography (e.g. Henri Cartier-Bresson).

== Controversy ==
=== Gustl Mollath case ===
In the context of the judicial scandal involving Gustl Mollath, UniCredit is named as the legal successor of HypoVereinsbank, which failed to forward an internal audit report on customers' capital transfer to Switzerland to the public prosecutor.

=== Financing of "junk properties" ===
From the 1990s, HypoVereinsbank put junk properties throughout Germany on the market and helped the buyers with the financing. The true value of the properties was concealed, while the estate agents were trained and remunerated accordingly. In one case, the aggrieved parties took their case to the Federal Court of Justice of Germany, which ruled that the bank was liable for the agent's transaction.

== Leadership ==
- 1998-2002: Albrecht Schmidt
- 2003-2005: Dieter Rampl
- 2006-2008: Wolfgang Sprißler
- 2009-2017: Theodor Weimer
- 2018-2023: Michael Diederich
- Since 2023: Marion Höllinger

== See also ==
- Deutsche Bank
- Commerzbank
- List of banks in Germany
