= Prussian State Bank =

Defunct Prussian state company

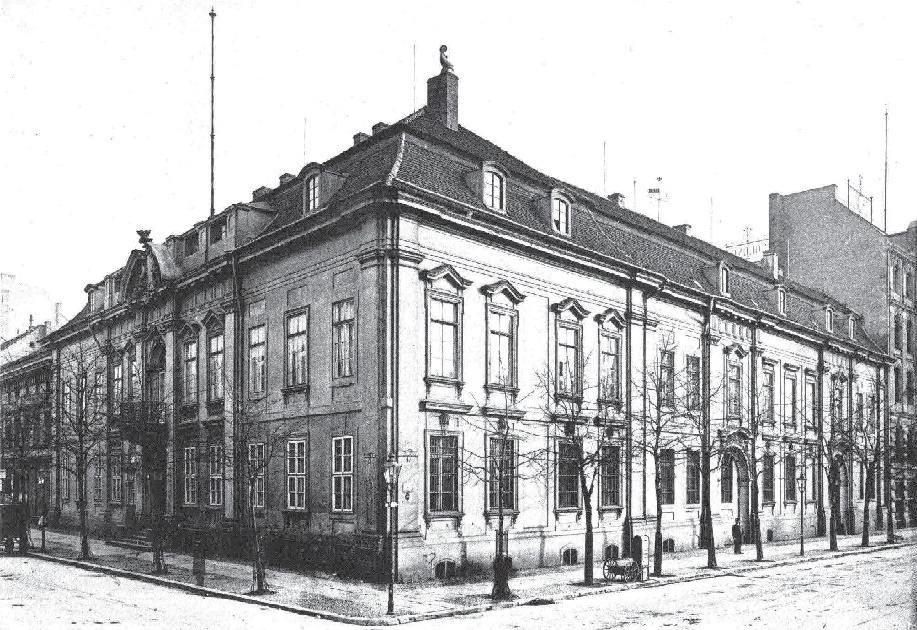
Old Seehandlungsgesellschaft building on Gendarmenmarkt, Berlin, demolished in 1901

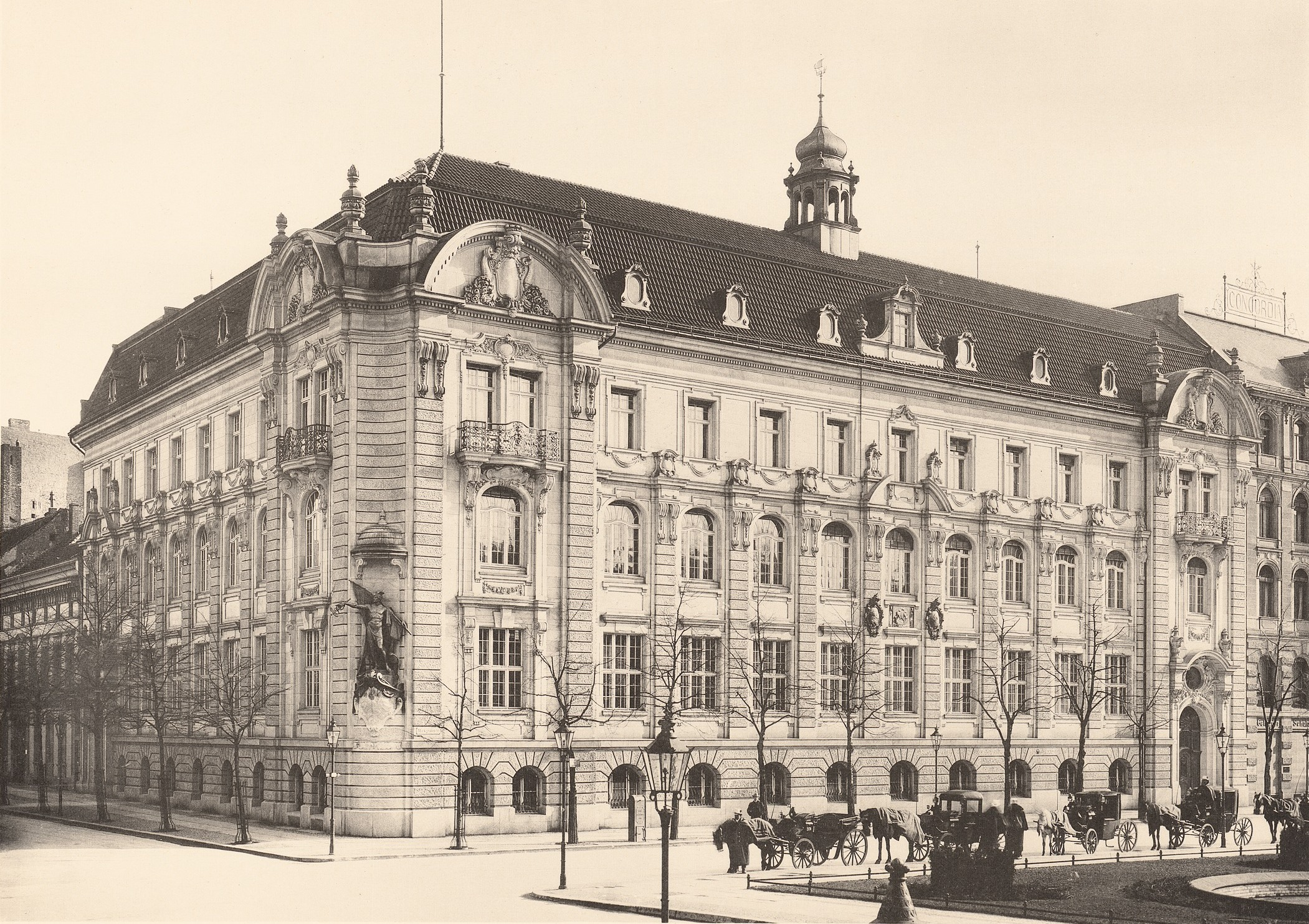
New building in 1904

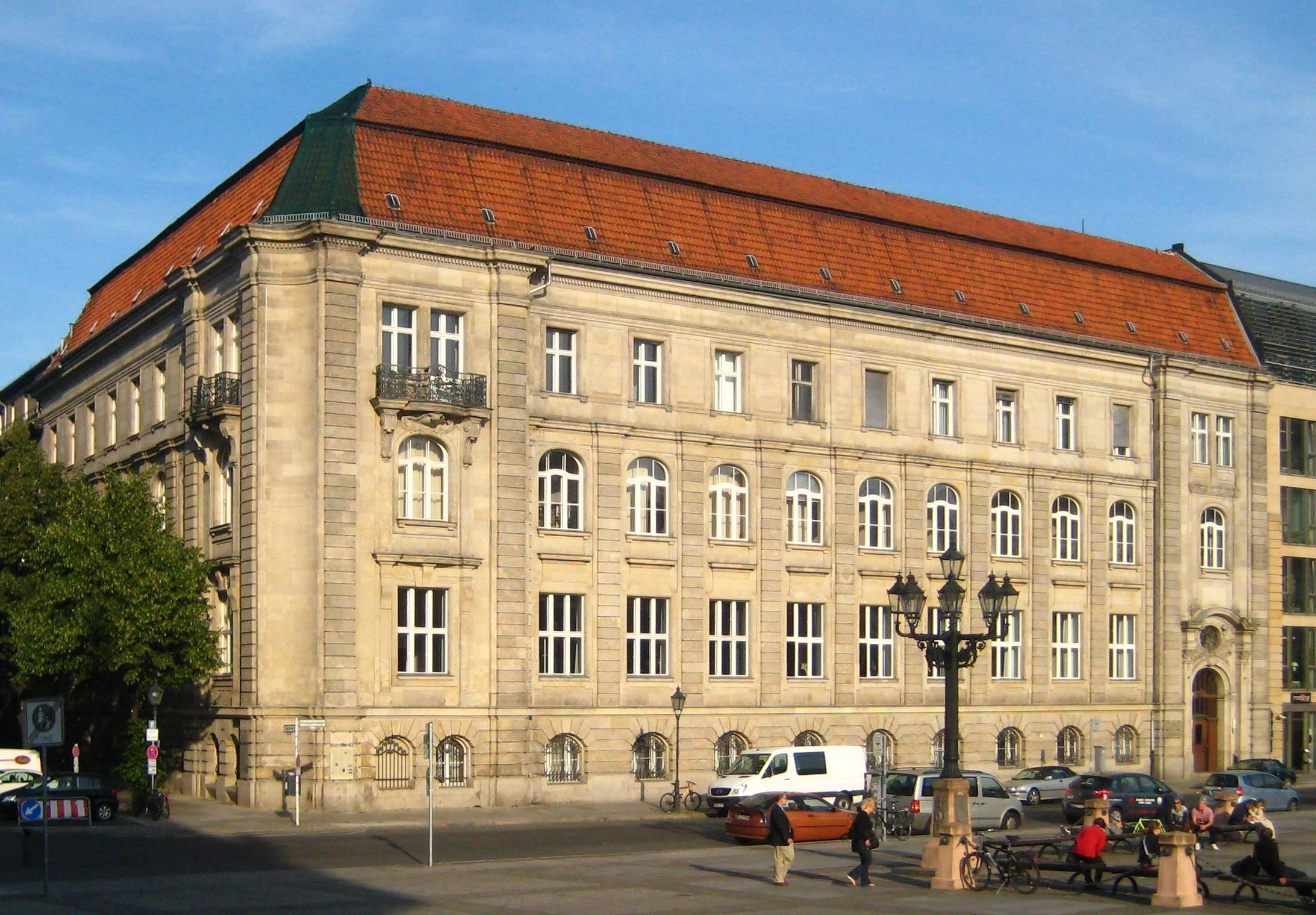
The same building, altered following World War II in 2009

The Prussian State Bank was a state-owned entity that played a significant role in the economy of the Kingdom of Prussia. It was founded in 1772 as a shipping company, the Seehandlungsgesellschaft or simply Seehandlung, intended to boost Prussia's foreign trade. In the course of the 19th century, it became increasingly active as a state bank, and was consequently renamed Königliche Seehandlung (Preußische Staatsbank) in 1904 and Preußische Staatsbank in 1918. It ceased activity in 1945 and was kept as a dormant entity, which was eventually liquidated in 1983.

== History ==
=== Shipping company ===
The Prussian sea trading company was founded in Berlin on October 14, 1772 at the instigation of Frederick the Great under the name Generaldirektion der Seehandlungs-Sozietät. The Prussian king acquired 2100 shares of this company and 300 shares were sold to private individuals. The company received the exclusive right to trade in sea salt and the staple right to all wax produced ten miles from the banks of the Vistula in Prussian territory. With its ships flying the Prussian flag, the company was to trade mainly though not exclusively with Spain, and maintained a commercial agent in Cádiz. Also on October 14, 1772, a special sea salt trading company, the Preußische Compagnie, was founded, which exported the sea salt imported from the sea trade to Poland. Both societies had received their privileges until 1796.

The Seehandlungsgesellschaft was also active in shipbuilding and erected two shipyards in Szczecin in 1776. It owned up to 14 ships of her own. The Königliche Seeschiffswerft in Havelberg delivered several seagoing vessels to the maritime trade from 1779 to 1785.

=== Transition to financial services ===
Despite the privileges, business initially went poorly. Under the leadership of Friedrich Wilhelm von der Schulenburg-Kehnert, the Preußische Compagnie was merged into the Seehandlung. After that, business improved, then expanded significantly. The Seehandlung had agents in Hamburg, Amsterdam, Warsaw in addition to Cadiz. In 1791, its sea trading privilege was extended until January 1, 1808. Although it lost its monopoly on wax trading on March 4, 1794, it received the right to trade in all goods and to conduct business of all kinds.

The Third Partition of Poland (1795), which followed soon afterwards, restricted the sales area for salt, and in its aftermath, the Napoleonic Wars negatively affected Prussian trade. The Seehandlung thus pivoted towards financial operations and the administration of Prussia's national debt. After Prussia lost the war against France in 1806, it paid war reparations to France and for that incurred large debts. After Napoleon's defeat in 1815, the Seehandlung in turn collected war reparations from France.

Since 1807, the Seehandlung had been under the control of the Prussian Ministry of Finance. On January 17, 1820, it became an independent financial and commercial state entity with unlimited legal capacity. Among other things, it was granted special rights to purchase salt from overseas, handle all financial transactions abroad on behalf of the Prussian state, pay all state debts incurred abroad, collect funds due to the state abroad and purchase goods from abroad. The Prussian government guaranteed all of the Seehandlung's obligations and appointed a board of trustees of three state officials to oversee it.

On May 3, 1821, it was decreed that the profits of the Seehandlung would no longer be paid to the state treasury, but would instead be accrued into its capital and from this a reserve fund would be formed, which the king could also use for state purposes in exceptional cases.

In 1822, the Seehandlung began shipping Silesian textile goods to Central and South America. This business led to the first Prussian circumnavigation of the world with the ship Mentor in 1822-1824, which was followed by six more circumnavigations of the world with the ship Princess Louise. At the same time, it promoted shipbuilding, also by buying the schooner brig Christian in the United States, which was intended as a model for Prussian shipbuilders. The Seehandlung also participated in many other ventures, such as road construction in Prussia and promoted railway construction.

In 1831, the Seehandlung took over steamship transport in and around Berlin and also began building inland vessels itself. The mechanical engineering institute and iron foundry of the Seehandlung in Berlin-Moabit was expanded to include a shipyard and introduced a technical innovation in Germany by making steamship hulls out of sheet iron instead of wood. In 1834-1835 the first all-iron steamer, the Prinz Carl, was built at the Moabit shipyard. The Seehandlung's steamship operation constantly ran at a loss. It was accepted in order not to let the nearest inland waters escape the "great advantages that steam navigation affords other countries". In 1848 the dissolution of the Seehandlung's shipping fleet began. The company's Moabit industrial operation was sold to August Borsig in 1850.

=== State bank ===
On February 14, 1845, it was decreed that the Seehandlung should no longer engage in any new commercial ventures and leave the salt trade to the tax authorities. The company was now transformed into a state bank subordinate to the Ministry of Finance. From then onwards, the Seehandlung gradually withdrew from its trading business. Trade in wine, flour and wool was maintained for a long time, however, and the Seehandlung also retained other commercial ventures, such as some textile factories and metalworking companies. It also continued to operate the steamboat service on the rivers Spree, Havel and Elbe.

From 1904 the institute traded as Königliche Seehandlung (Preußische Staatsbank). In 1918 it was renamed the Preußische Staatsbank (Seehandlung). Active in all areas of banking until 1945, by the 1930s it had come under the dominant influence of the Reichsbank.

With the dissolution of Prussia in 1947, the Prussian State Bank became a dormant entity. In 1983 the bank was liquidated and its remaining assets were transferred to Berliner Pfandbriefbank. A small portion of the assets of the former Prussian State Bank formed the basis for the Stiftung Preußische Seehandlung, a state foundation.

== Leadership ==
- Julius August von der Horst, President 1772-1774
- Johann Gottlieb Schlee, President 1774-1775?
- Friedrich Christoph von Görne, President 1775-1782
- Friedrich Wilhelm von der Schulenburg-Kehnert, President 1782-1786 and 1790-1791
- Alexander Friedrich Georg von der Schulenburg, President 1786-1790
- Carl August von Struensee, Director from 1782, President 1791-1804
- Heinrich Friedrich Karl vom und zum Stein, President 1804–1807
- Christian Rother, President 1820-1848
- August Friedrich Bloch, President 1848-1854
- Otto von Camphausen, President 1854-1869
- William Barstow von Guenther, President 1870-1873?
- Rudolf von Bitter der Ältere, President 1873-1880?
- Max Rötger, President 1880-1886
- Emil von Burchard, President 1887-1899?
- Octavio von Zedlitz-Neukirch, President in 1899
- Rudolf Havenstein, President 1900-1908
- Adolf von Dombois, President 1909-1924
- Franz Schroeder, President 1924-1945

== Head office building ==
In 1777, Friedrich II rented the Domestikenhaus, built in 1735 under Frederick William I on Berlin's Gendarmenmarkt at the corner with Jägerstraße, for the newly established Seehandlungsgesellschaft. In 1787 the Seehandlung acquired the building and had major changes carried out by architect David Gilly in 1806. In 1901 the old baroque building was demolished and replaced by a new building designed by architect Paul Kieschke, completed in 1903. In 1936-1939 an extension was built at Jägerstraße 22/23. After the war damage was repaired, the building complex was handed over in 1946 to the newly established German Academy of Sciences at Berlin, renamed the Academy of Sciences of the GDR in 1972. Since 1992 it has housed the latter’s successor institution, the Berlin-Brandenburg Academy of Sciences and Humanities.

== See also ==
- Bavarian State Bank
- SMS Preussischer Adler
- SMS Loreley (1859)
- List of banks in Germany
