= Hofpfisterei =

German bakery chain

- Native name: Ludwig Stocker Hofpfisterei GmbH
- Industry: Bakery
- Founded: 1331
- Headquarters: Kreittmayrstraße 5, 80335 Munich, Germany
- Key people: Margaretha Stocker (strategic management), Nicole Stocker (managing director)
- Number of employees: 910 (2010)
- Website: www.hofpfisterei.de

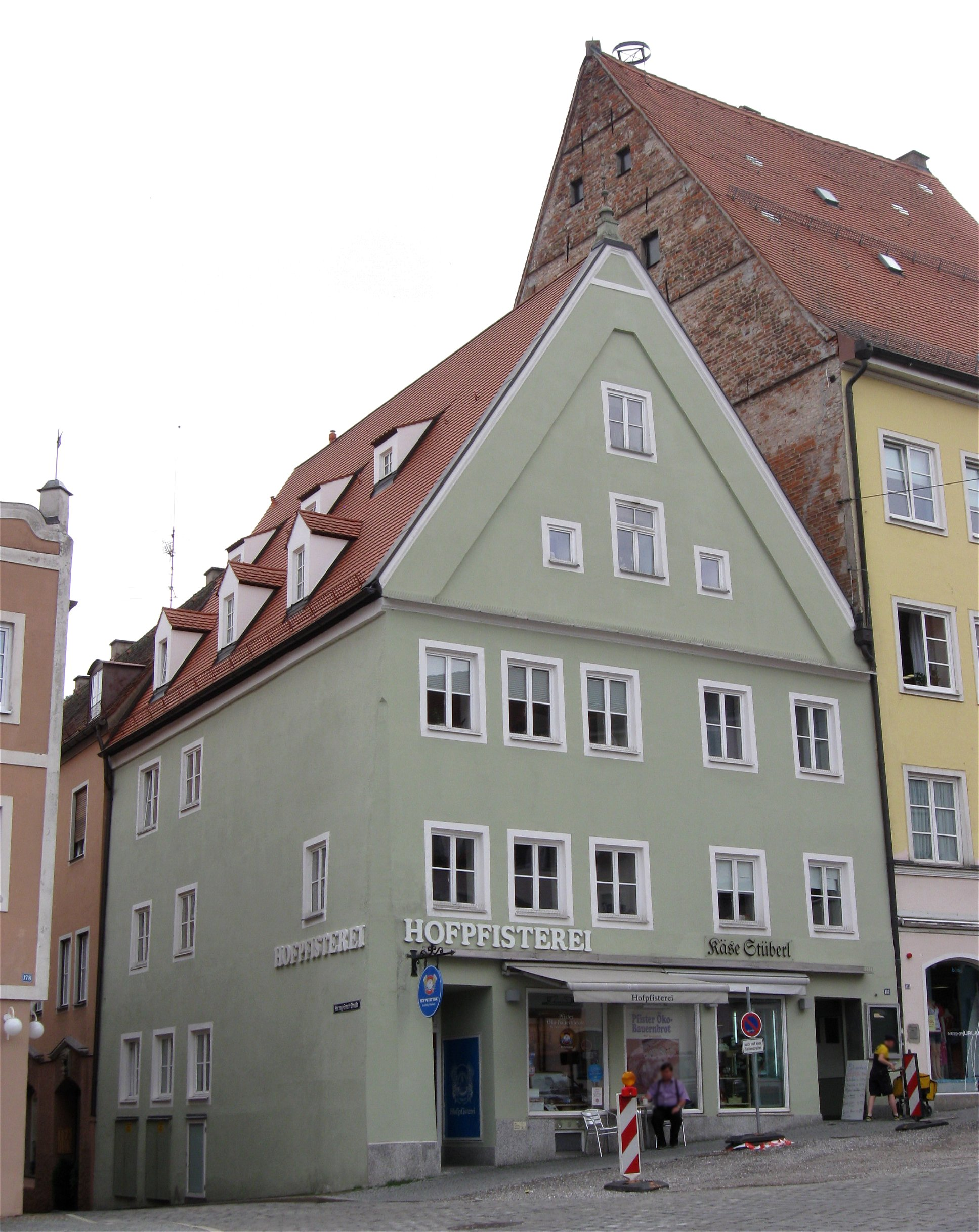
Hofpfisterei shop on Hauptplatz 180 in Landsberg.

Hofpfisterei is a chain of bakery shops, headquartered in Munich, Bavaria, Germany. Its business focusses on southern Germany. It has 163 branches and employs about 950 people.

Its history reaches back to the year 1331 when the mill Toratsmühle was mentioned for the first time.

The bakery also sells its products online.

From 1978 the bread contains no additives and the flours are examined for residues in their own laboratory. However, examinations by foodwatch in 2008 showed that some additives had been used and Hofpfisterei has since made some changes.

== See also ==
- List of oldest companies
