= Bayerische Vereinsbank =

Former German bank

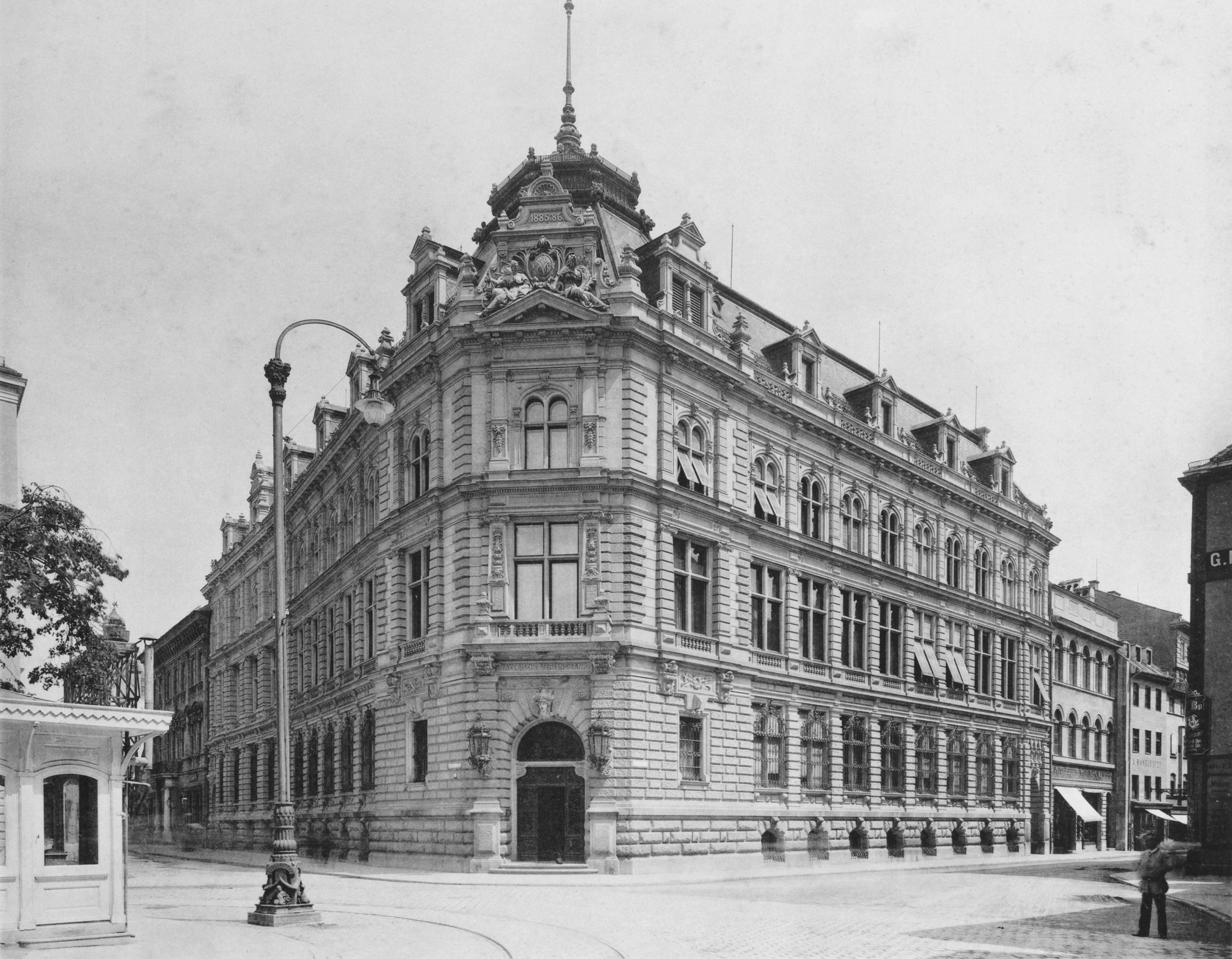
- Munich head office of Vereinsbank, designed by Wilhelm Martens and erected in two phases 1885-1886 and 1891-1893
- Company type: Public company
- Industry: Financial services
- Founded: 1869
- Defunct: 1998
- Fate: Merged
- Successor: HypoVereinsbank
- Headquarters: Munich, Germany
- Area served: Bavaria
- Products: Banking services

The Bayerische Vereinsbank (lit. 'Bavarian Union Bank') was a German bank founded in 1869 in Munich. It developed into one of the largest regional banks in Germany, before merging in 1998 with Bayerische Hypotheken- und Wechsel-Bank (also known as Hypo-Bank) to form HypoVereinsbank (HVB).

== History ==
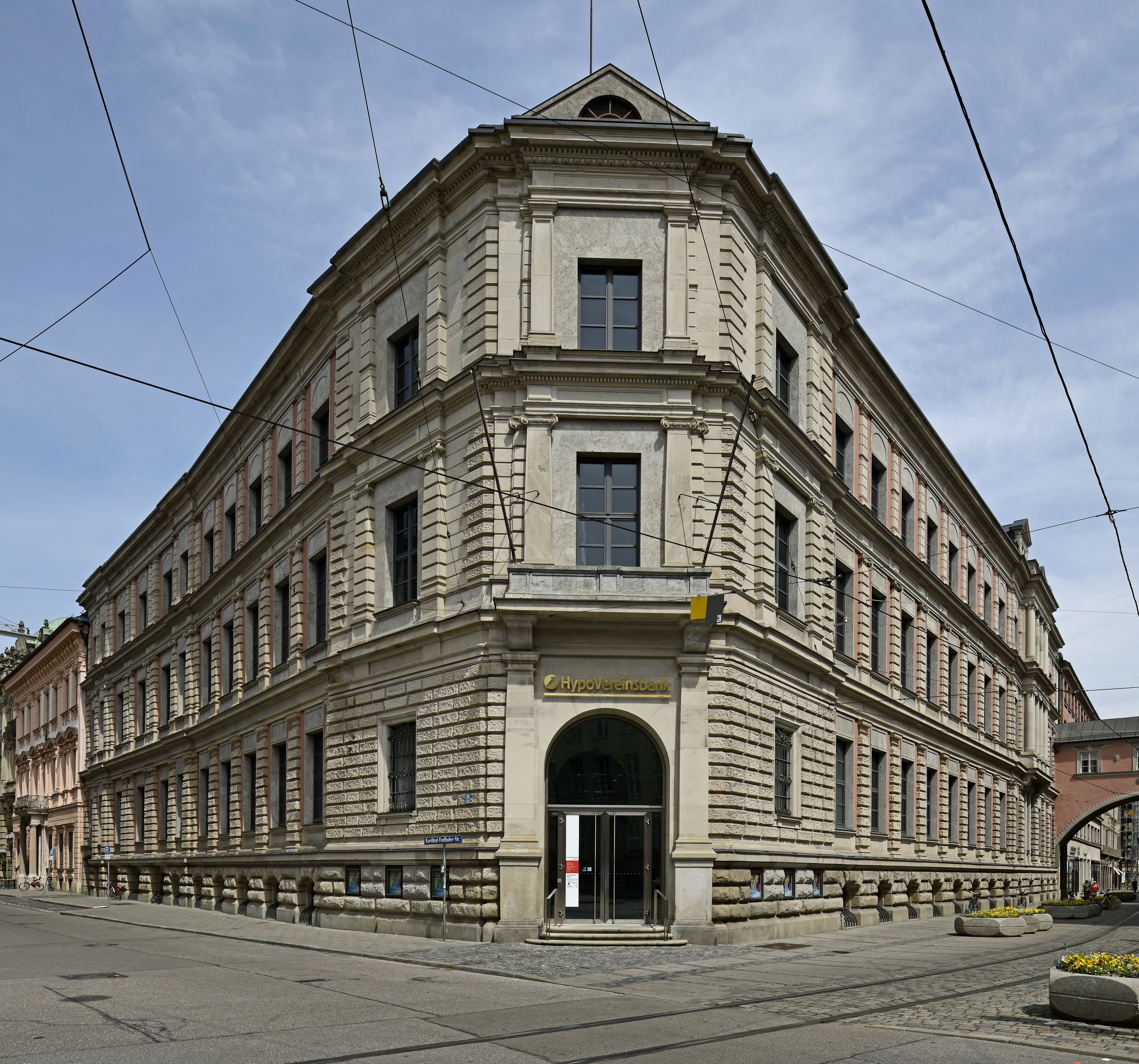
The same building in 2018, still used by HypoVereinsbank

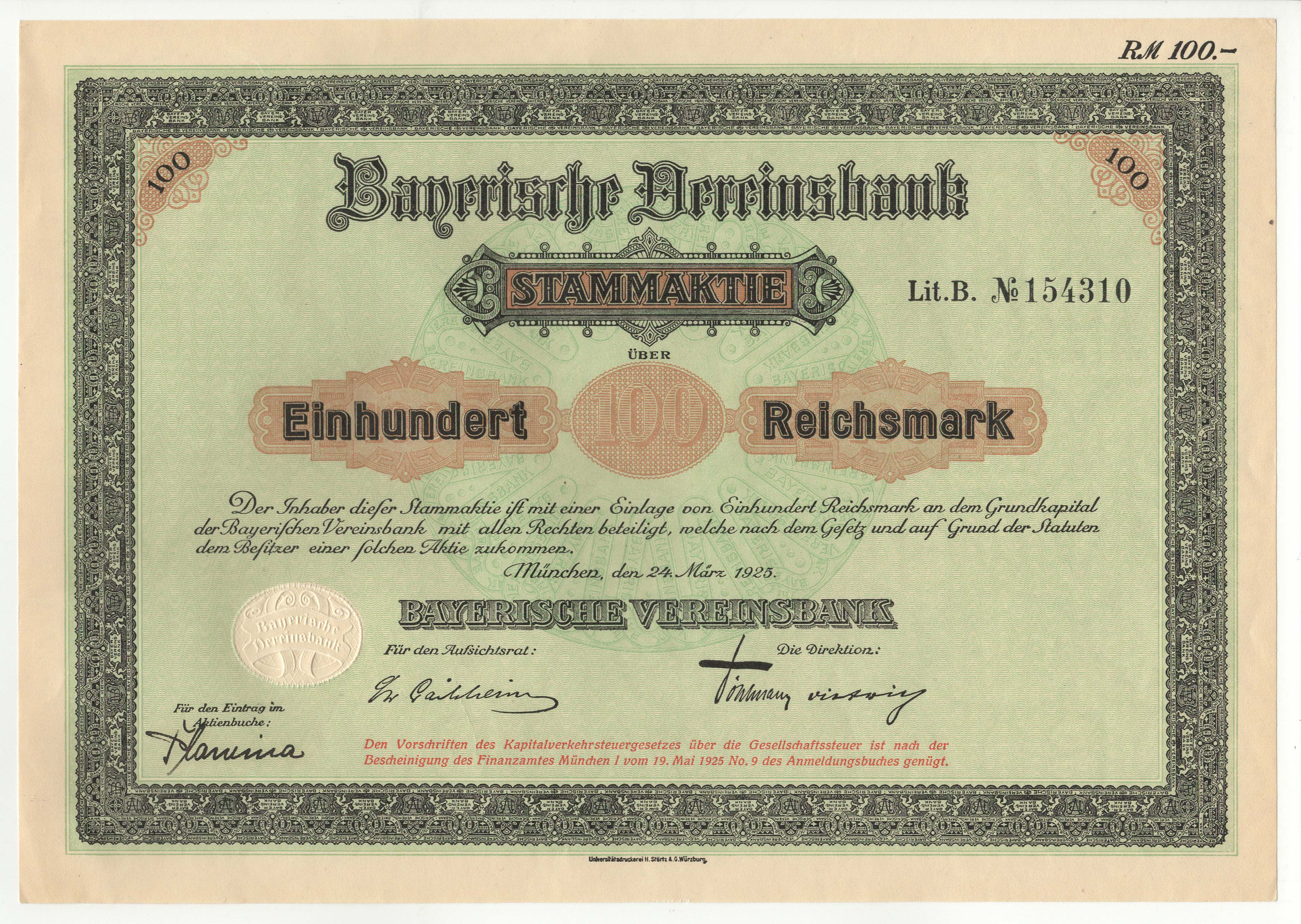
Share of the Bayerische Vereinsbank, issued 25 March 1925

The Bayerische Vereinsbank was the result of a private initiative by Munich- and Augsburg-based court bankers, members of the nobility as well as common merchants in 1869, for which King Ludwig II granted a concession to set up a public company limited by shares.

Two years later, it received permission for land-financing transactions. Bayerische Vereinsbank was then allowed to carry out mortgage banking business operations in addition to other banking business.

By 1930, it was Germany's tenth-largest joint-stock bank with 201 million Reichsmarks in total deposits, behind Deutsche Bank & Disconto-Gesellschaft (4.8 billion), Danat-Bank (2.4 billion), Dresdner Bank (2.3 billion), and Commerz- und Privatbank (1.5 billion), Reichs-Kredit-Gesellschaft (619 million), Berliner Handels-Gesellschaft (412 million), Barmer Bankverein (366 million), Allgemeine Deutsche Credit-Anstalt (364 million), and its local peer the Hypo-Bank (272 million).

In the 1950s and 1960s, Bayerische Vereinsbank started to expand throughout Germany and abroad. In 1971 it acquired the Bavarian State Bank, in 1978 Bankhaus Röchling in Saarbrücken, and in 1991, Bankhaus Friedrich Simon (also known as Simonbank) in Düsseldorf. By 1997, it had become the fifth-largest bank in Germany after Deutsche Bank, Dresdner Bank, WestLB, and Commerzbank. The next year, partly as a defensive move against a possible takeover by Deutsche Bank, it merged with its longstanding rival Hypo-Bank, despite the latter's troubled investments in commercial property.

== Leadership ==
- 1869–1873: Andreas Siegel
- 1873–1897: Friedrich Volz
- 1898–1907: Joseph Pütz
- 1908–1928: Adolf Pöhlmann
- 1929–1937: Hans Christian Dietrich
- 1938–1956: Karl Butzengeiger
- 1956–1959: Wilhelm Biber
- 1959–1968: Hans Christoph Freiherr Tucher von Simmelsdorf
- 1968–1975: Werner Premauer
- 1975–1990: Maximilian Hackl
- 1990–1998: Albrecht Schmidt

== See also ==
- Bayerische Hypotheken- und Wechsel-Bank
- Bavarian State Bank
- Bayerische Notenbank
- List of banks in Germany
