= Bayerische Hypotheken- und Wechsel-Bank =

Former German bank

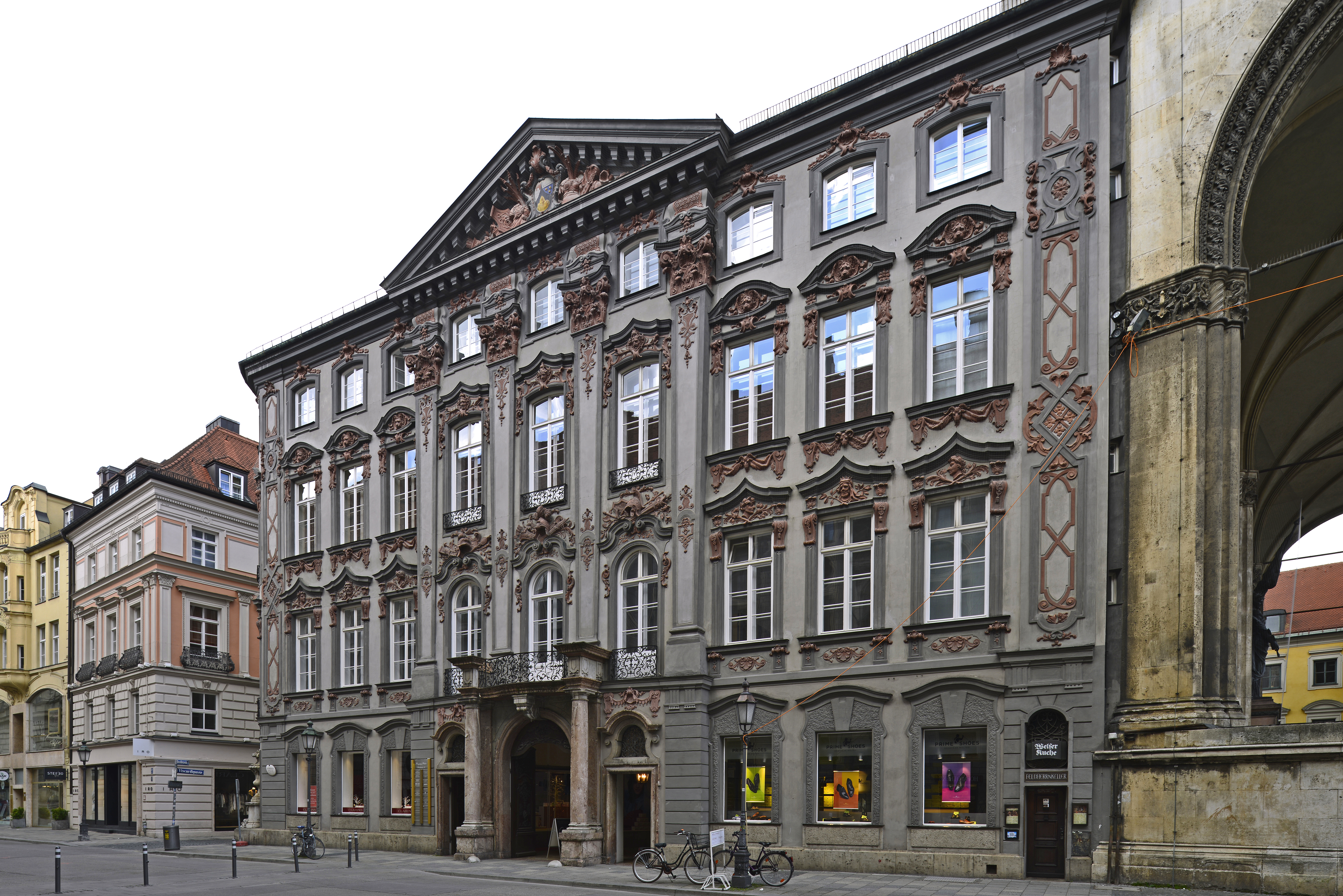
Palais Preysing in Munich, head office of Hypo-Bank from 1835 to 1898

The Bayerische Hypotheken- und Wechsel-Bank (lit. 'Bavarian Mortgage and Exchange Bank', also known as Hypo-Bank) was a German bank founded in 1834 in Munich. It developed into one of the largest regional banks in Germany, before merging in 1998 with Bayerische Vereinsbank to form HypoVereinsbank (HVB).

== Overview ==
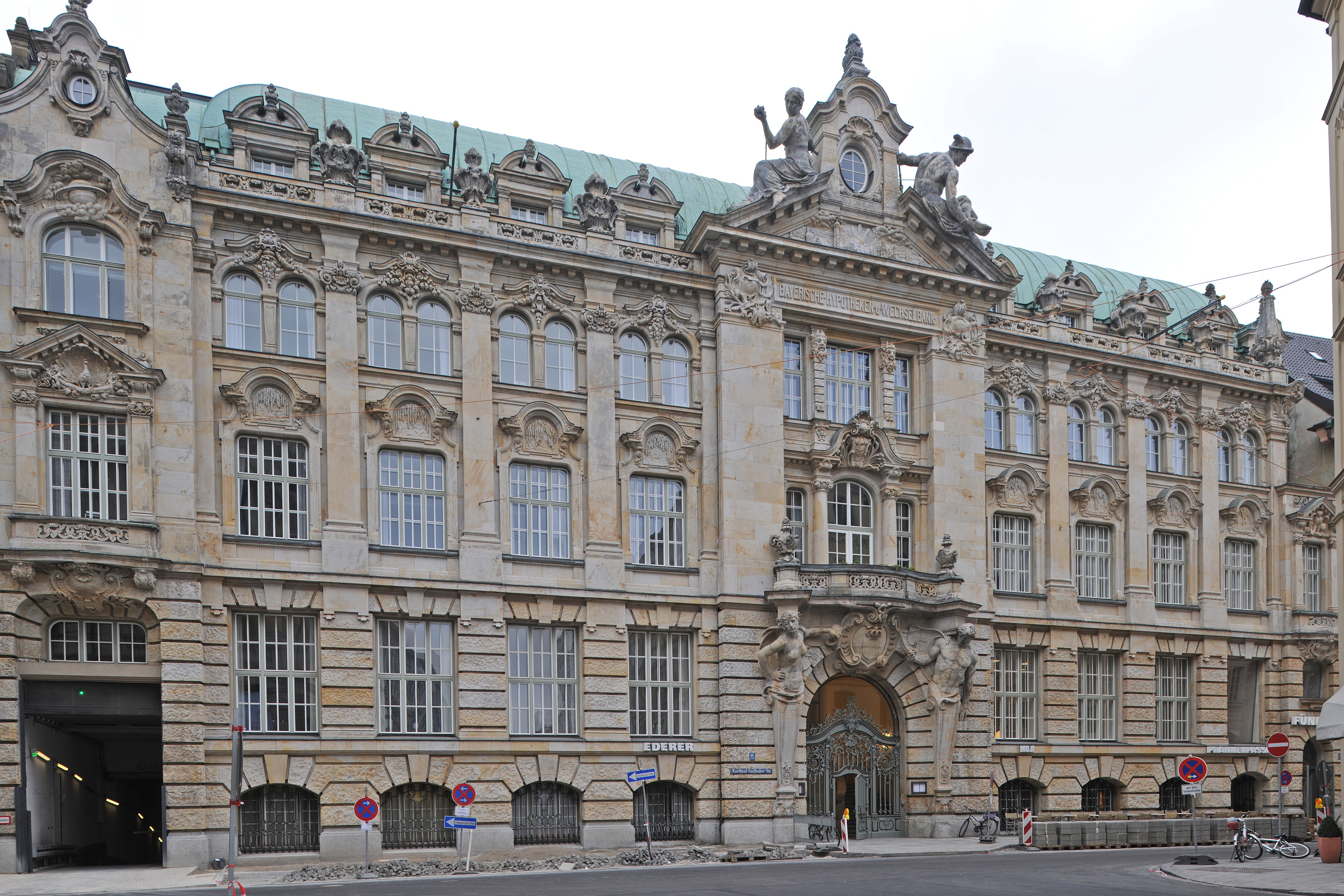
Hypo-Bank head office inaugurated 1898 on Kardinal-Faulhaber-Straße in Munich; redeveloped from 1994 into the Fünf Höfe commercial complex

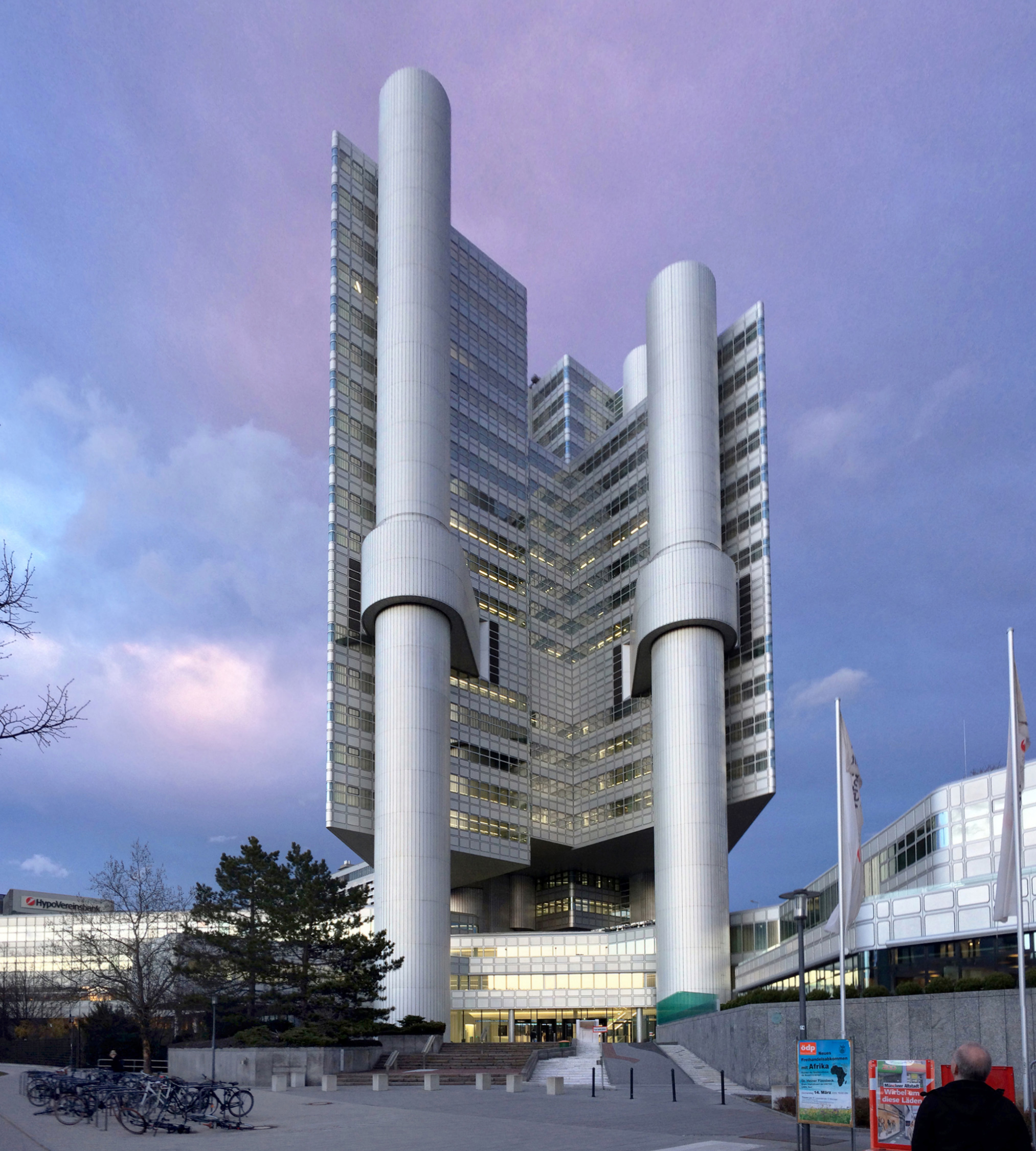
Hypo-Haus in Munich, new head office of Hypo-Bank completed in 1981

The Bayerische Hypotheken- und Wechsel-Bank was founded by law of 1 July 1834 on the initiative of King Ludwig I of Bavaria, following discussions going back to 1818. It started operations on 1 October 1835, with the king as one of its founding shareholders. While established as a stock corporation, it was under tight government supervision and its commercial business was initially limited to mortgages. In 1836, it was granted the privilege to issue notes in Bavaria and kept it until the creation of the Reichsbank in 1875, when the purpose-created Bayerische Notenbank took it over. It also had the right to issue Pfandbriefs from 1864, eventually developing into the largest mortgage bank in Germany in the late 19th century. Until 1905, its activity was limited to Southern Bavaria, while the northern part of the kingdom was the remit of the Bavarian State Bank. It also developed an insurance business, eventually spun off as Bayerische Versicherungsbank in 1906.

The Hypo-Bank was shaken by hyperinflation in the Weimar Republic in 1921–1923, when it had to sell Bayerische Versicherungsbank to Allianz, but was able to rebuild balance sheet strength in the later 1920s. By 1930, it was Germany's ninth-largest joint-stock bank with 271 million Reichsmarks in total deposits, and the third-largest one headquartered outside Berlin, behind Deutsche Bank & Disconto-Gesellschaft (4.8 billion), Danat-Bank (2.4 billion), Dresdner Bank (2.3 billion), and Commerz- und Privatbank (1.5 billion), Reichs-Kredit-Gesellschaft (619 million), Berliner Handels-Gesellschaft (412 million), Barmer Bankverein (366 million), and Allgemeine Deutsche Credit-Anstalt (364 million). It survived the European banking crisis of 1931 comparatively unscathed. During the Nazi era, the Hypo-Bank, which had a large Jewish customer base, was initially reluctant to display enthusiasm for the regime but had to implement the official aryanization policy from 1938. In 1939, following the Nazi Anschluss of Austria, it acquired the former Austrian state-owned Credit-Institut für Öffentliche Unternehmungen, which it renamed Hypotheken- und Credit-Institut in Wien.

Unlike the larger Deutsche Bank, Dresdner Bank and Commerzbank which were temporarily broken up, Hypo-Bank was spared by the banking reforms of the immediate postwar period. It was the first bank in Germany with which citizens of the newly founded state of Israel voluntarily resumed business relationships. It expanded beyond Bavaria in the 1960s, then internationally, until overextending its risk-taking in commercial property lending and merging with its longstanding rival Bayerische Vereinsbank in 1998.

== See also ==
- Bayerische Vereinsbank
- Bavarian State Bank
- Bayerische Notenbank
- List of banks in Germany
