= Bayerische Notenbank =

Former German bank

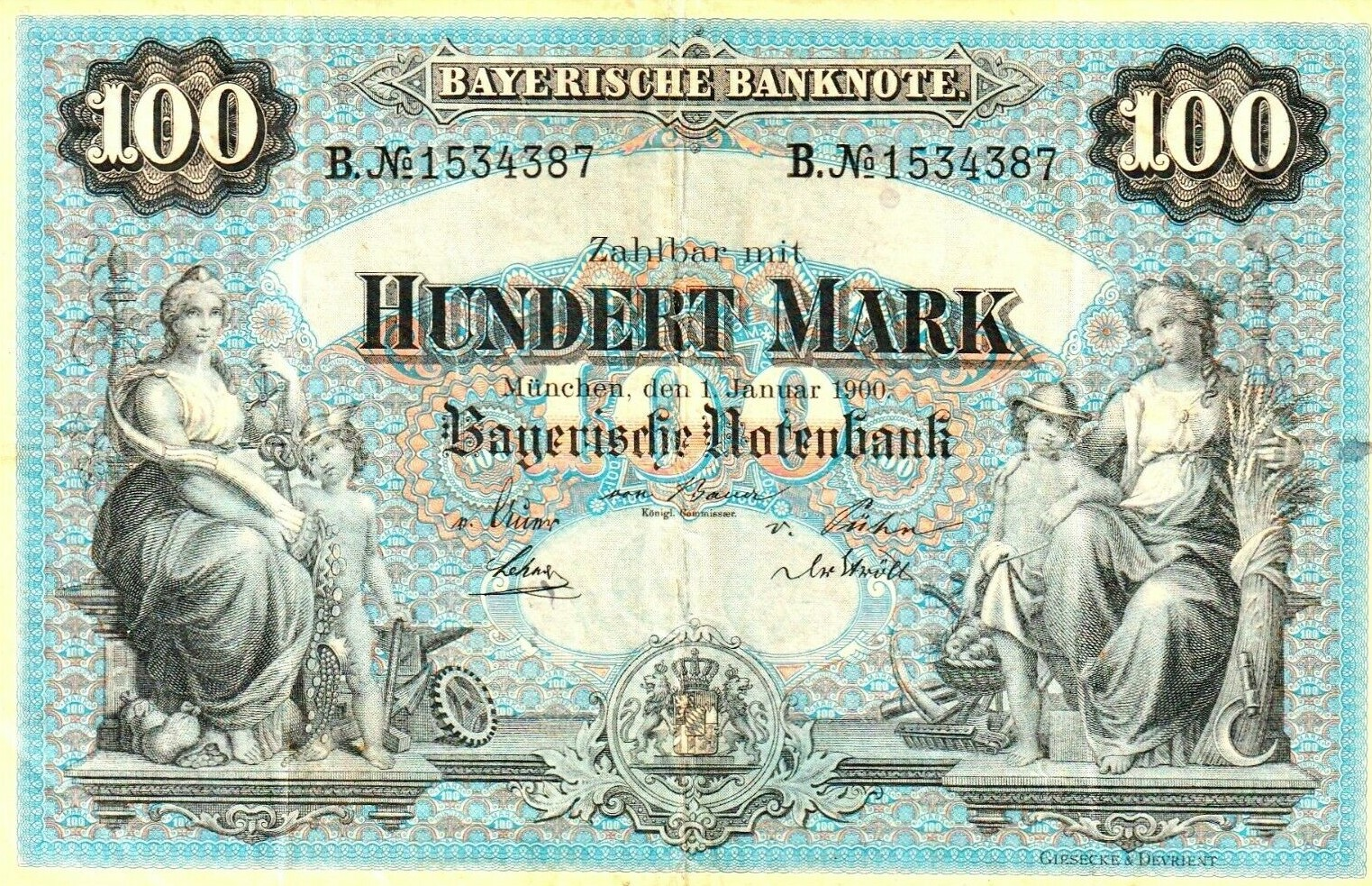
- 100-Mark note of the Bayerische Notenbank issued in 1900
- Type: Private company
- Industry: Financial services
- Founded: 1875
- Defunct: 1934
- Fate: After losing not issuing privilege absorbed by state institution
- Successor: Bavarian State Bank
- Headquarters: Munich, Germany
- Area served: Bavaria
- Products: Note issuing

The Bayerische Notenbank (lit. 'Bavarian Bank of Issue') was a German note-issuing bank, founded in 1875 in Munich. It lost its issuance privilege in 1935 and was merged that same year into the Bavarian State Bank.

== History ==
In 1875, the monetary unification reform that created the Reichsbank allowed local bank to keep issuing legal-tender banknotes, but restricted the commercial activities in which such banks could engage, including mortgage lending. As a consequence, Hypo-Bank decided to relinquish its note-issuing role and to transfer it into an entity specifically created for that purpose, the Bayerische Notenbank. Two thirds of the new bank's capital was issued to the existing shareholders of Hypo-Bank, with Hypo-Bank and the Bavarian government each taking an additional one-sixth.

By 1890, the Bayerische Notenbank had a network of six main branches in Augsburg, Kempten, Nuremberg, Regensburg, Würzburg, and Ludwigshafen in the Bavarian Circle of the Rhine, complemented by 28 smaller agencies.

On 1 January 1935, as a consequence of a reform that terminated all remaining local note-issuance privileges in Germany, the Bayerische Notenbank was absorbed by the Bavarian State Bank.

== See also ==
- Bayerische Hypotheken- und Wechsel-Bank
- Bavarian State Bank
- List of banks in Germany
