= Bavarian State Bank =

Former German bank

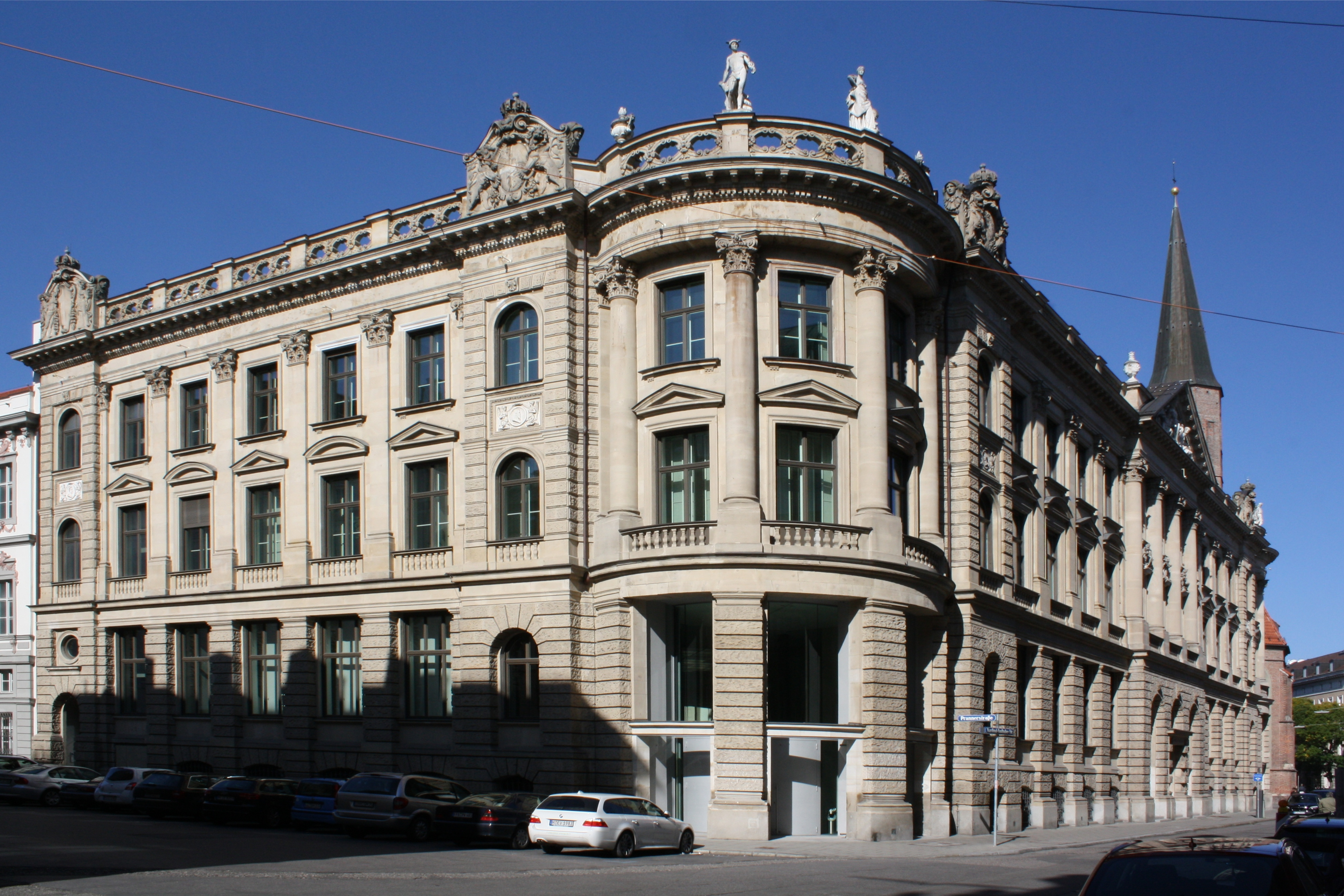
- Former head office of the State Bank on Kardinal-Faulhaber-Straße in Munich
- Type: State-owned enterprise
- Industry: Financial services
- Founded: 1780
- Defunct: 1971
- Fate: Acquired
- Successor: Bayerische Vereinsbank
- Headquarters: Nuremberg and later Munich, Germany
- Area served: Bavaria
- Products: Banking services
- Owner: German government

The Bavarian State Bank (German: Bayerische Staatsbank) was a German government-owned bank, initially founded in 1780 and merged into Bayerische Vereinsbank in 1971.

== History ==
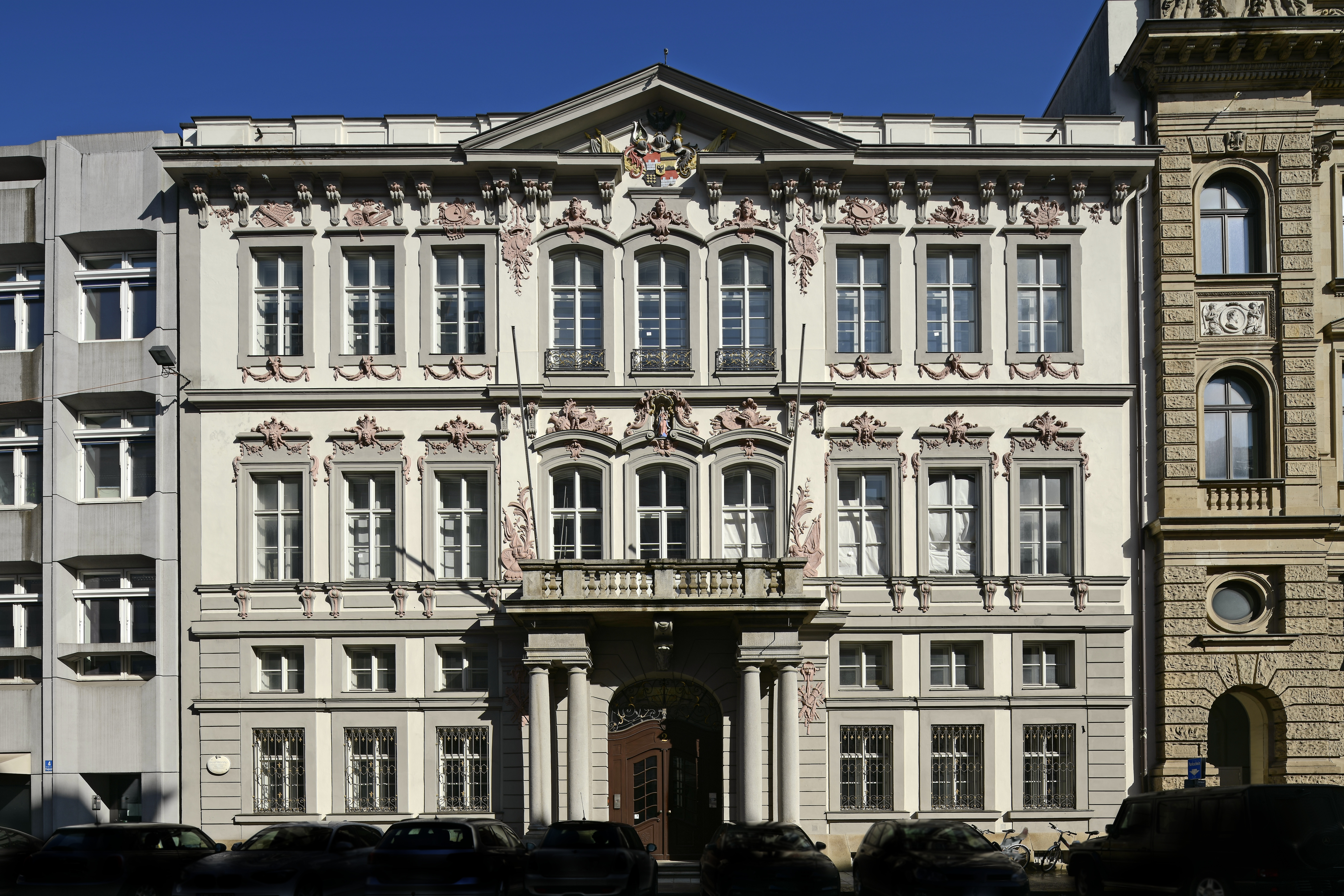
Palais Neuhaus-Preysing, purchased by the bank as headquarters extension in 1898

In 1780, Margrave Alexander of Brandenburg-Ansbach, inspired by the example of the Prussian Royal Bank in Berlin, founded the Hochfürstlich-Brandenburg-Anspach-Bayreuthische Hofbanco (lit. 'Princely Court Bank of Brandenburg-Anspach-Bayreuth') in Ansbach, using a small amount of 15,000 guilders as operating capital. The margrave resorted to this plan for economic reasons, as he wanted to avoid the fees charged by the foreign banks and access the aid funds provided by England for his soldier trade. The American Revolutionary War between England and France in North America had led England to conclude contracts with German counts and request troops from them in exchange for aid funds. In 1792, the Principality of Ansbach was taken over by Prussia and the bank was renamed Königlich Preußische Banco in Franken. In 1806, Ansbach became part of Bavaria and the bank became Königlich Baierische Banco, then Königliche Bank Nürnberg as its seat was relocated to Nuremberg in 1807. It opened operations in Würzburg in 1835, then in Augsburg and Munich in 1875, the latter known as the Royal Subsidiary Bank (German: Königliche Filialbank).

The end of the monarchy in Bavaria in 1918 saw the renaming of the bank to Bavarian State Bank. It was eventually acquired by the Vereinsbank in 1971.

In late 2023, a luxury Rosewood hotel opened in the former building of the State Bank in Munich, including the adjacent 18th-century Palais Neuhaus-Preysing which the bank had purchased in 1898.

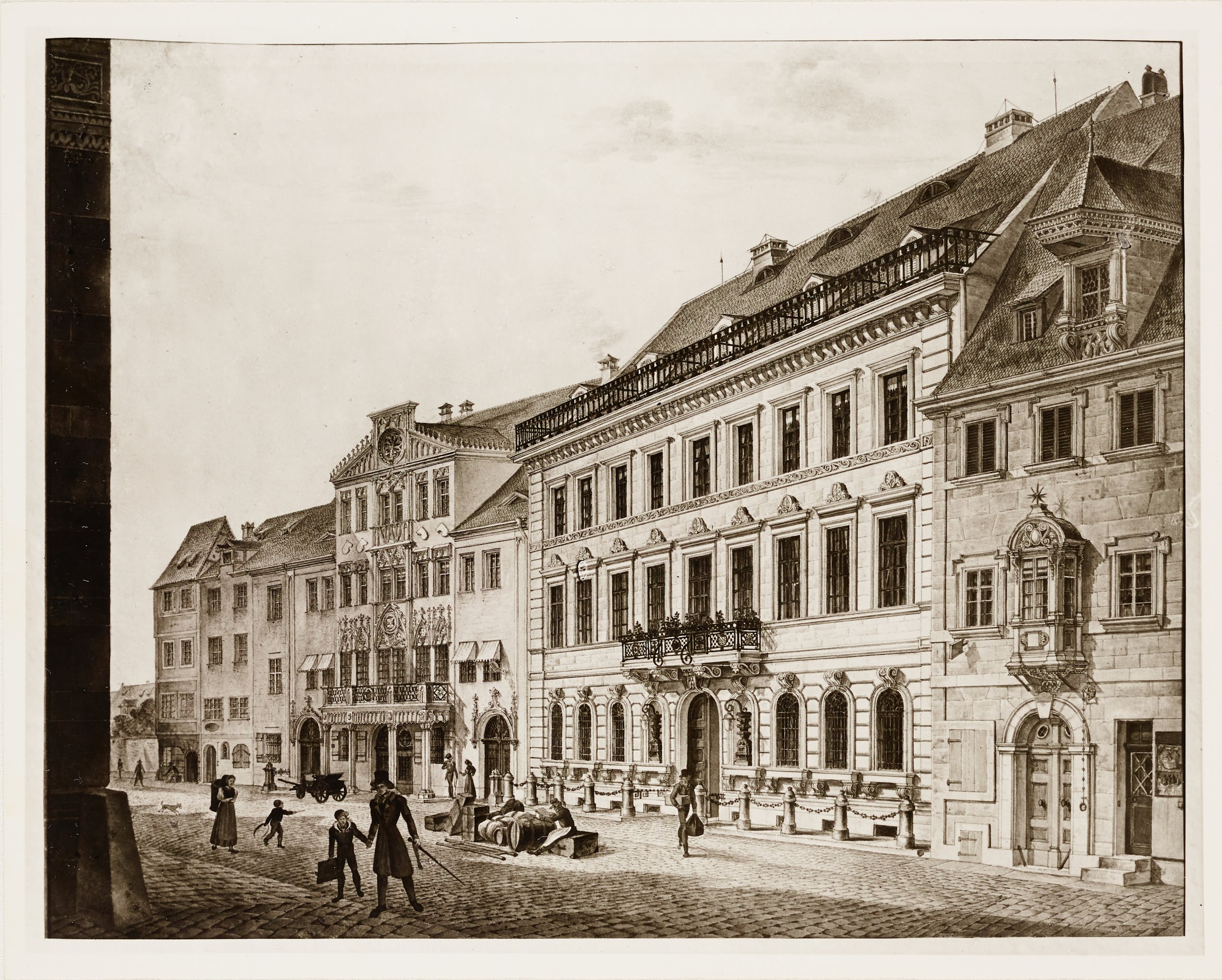
Former Heilsbronner Hof on Lorenzer Platz in Nuremberg, seat of the Royal Bank from 1807 (pictured in 1837)

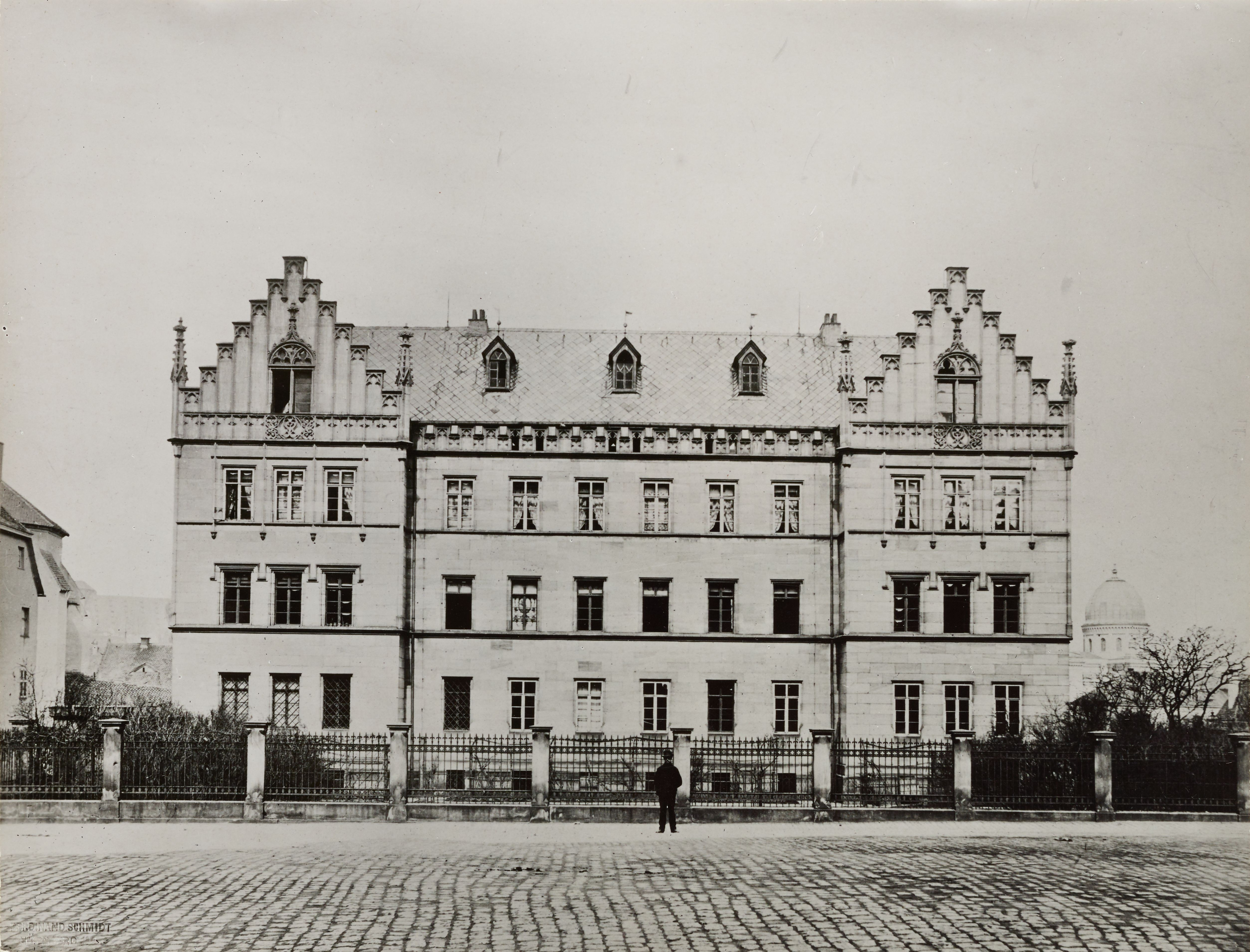
Building erected for the Royal Bank on the same location in the later 19th century

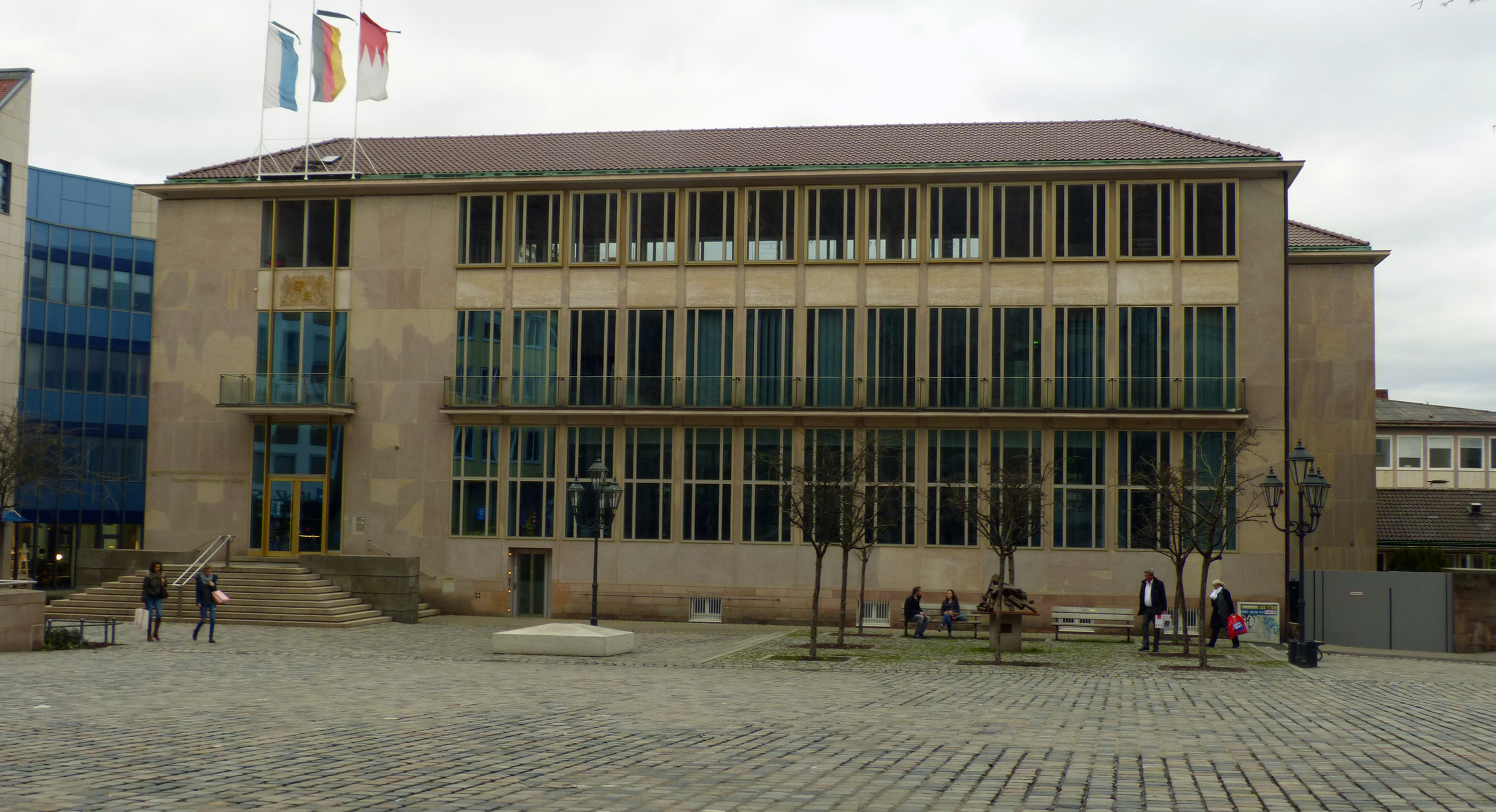
Bavarian State Bank head office on the same location, designed after World War II by Sep Ruf and repurposed in the 2010s for the Bavarian Finance Ministry

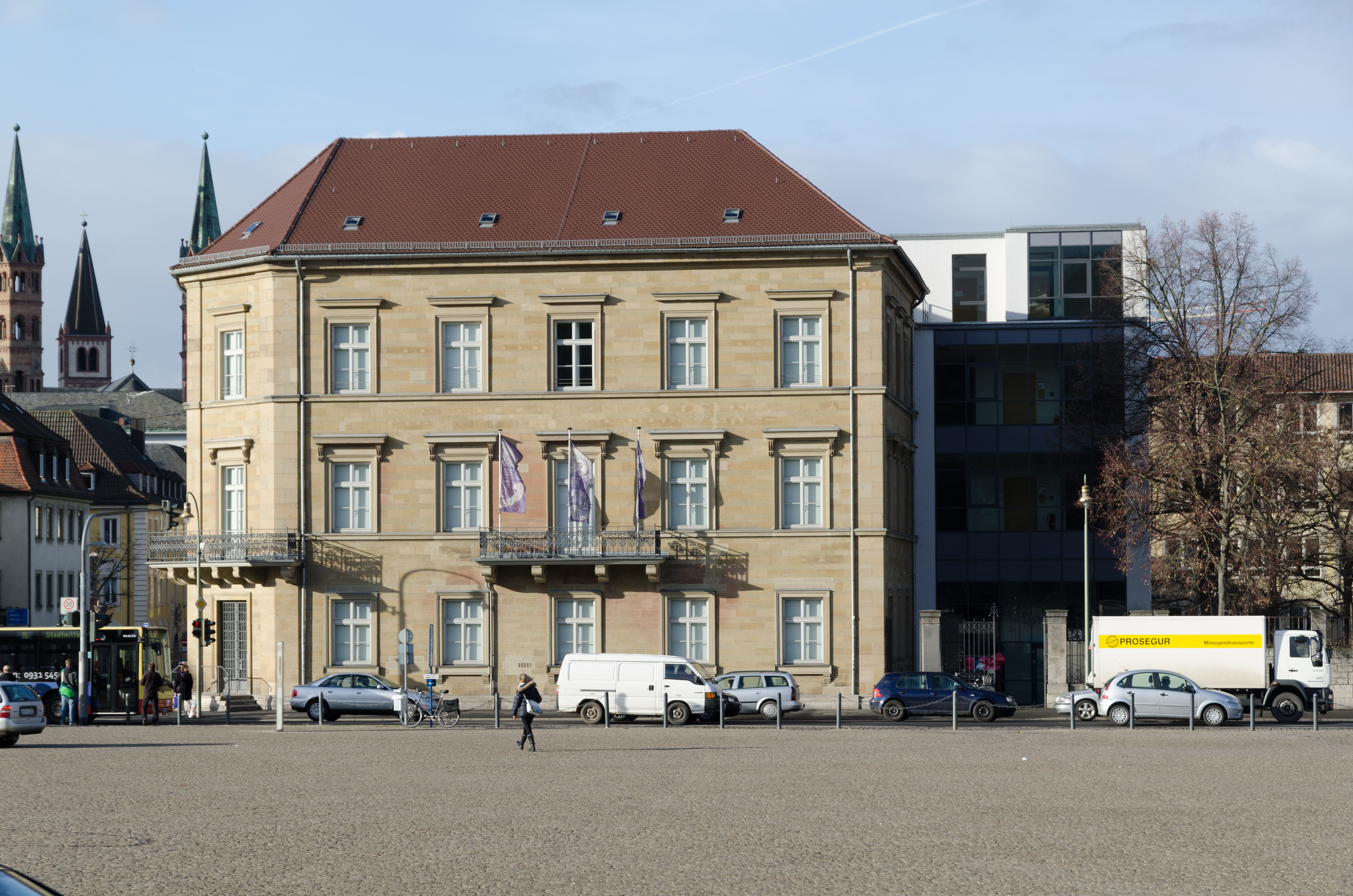
Royal Bank branch in Würzburg, Hofstrasse 13

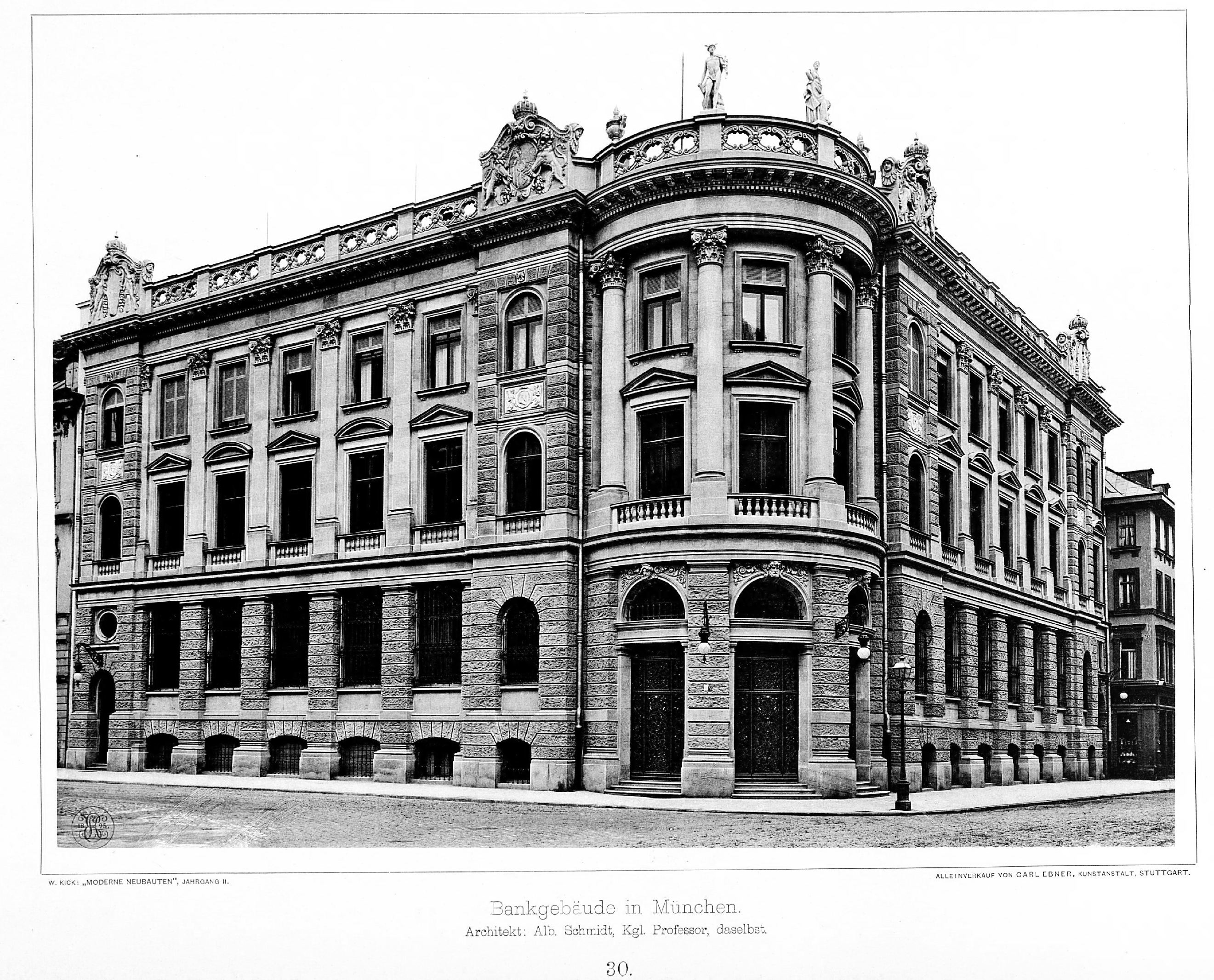
Building of the Royal Subsidiary Bank (later State Bank) in Munich, in 1898

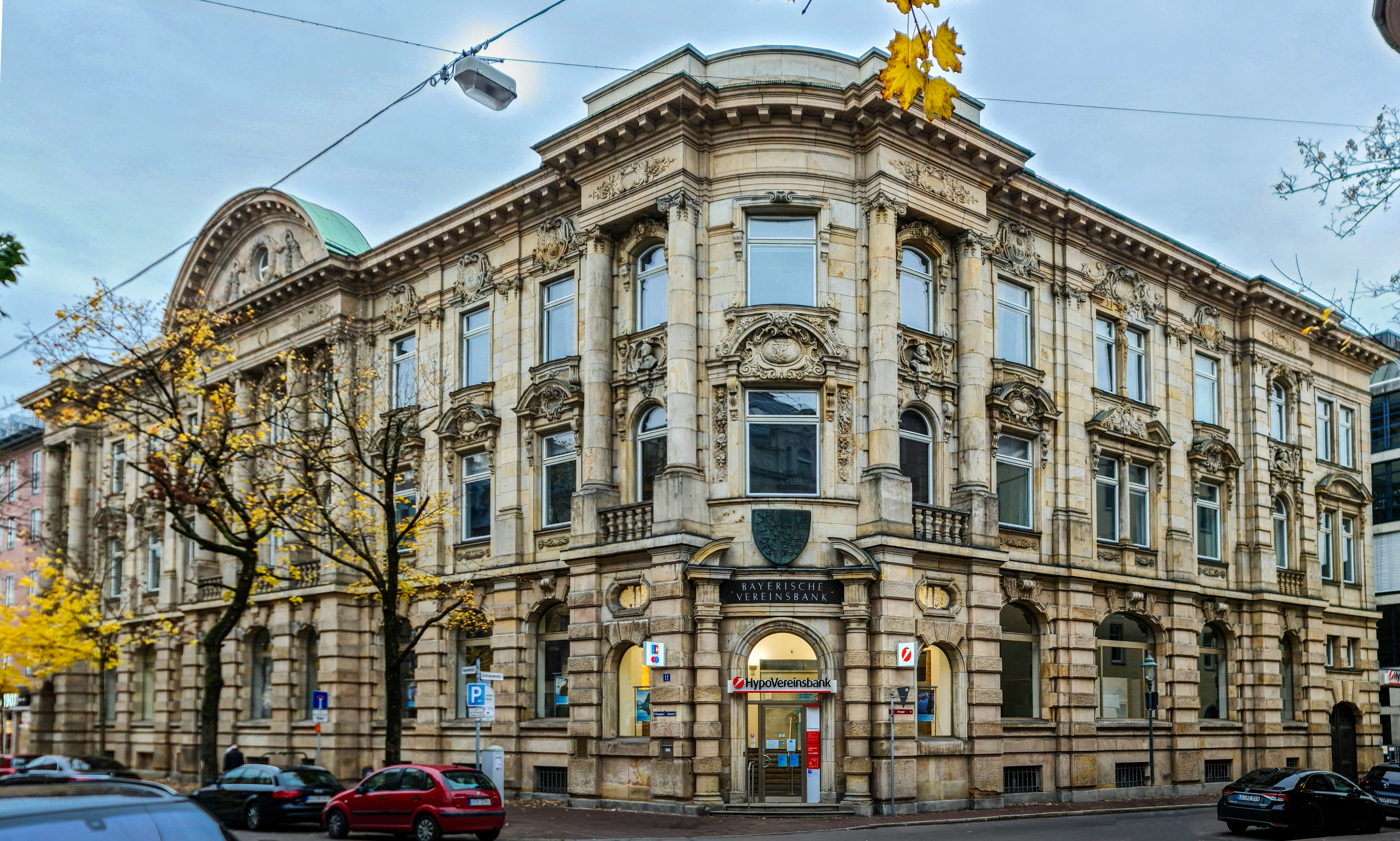
Bavarian Royal Bank subsidiary building in Augsburg, inaugurated 1899

== Leadership ==
- 1780–1792: Wilhelm Friedrich von Benkendorff
- 1792–1806: Karl August von Hardenberg
- 1806–1819: Johann Georg von Kracker
- 1819–1839: Johann Georg Eberhard Faber
- 1839–1845: Johann Philipp Siess
- 1845–1851: Christian Friedrich Heinrich Lentz
- 1851–1861: Johann Gottfried Christian von Mayer
- 1861–1862: Friedrich Carl Burkart
- 1862–1878: Christian von Pfeufer
- 1878–1898: Ferdinand von Landgraf
- 1898–1909: Andreas von Seisser
- 1909–1915: Wilhelm von Burkhard
- 1915–1919: Franz von Coluzzi
- 1919–1928: Hugo Arnold
- 1928–1934: Wilhelm von Wolf
- 1934–1942: Paul Hammer
- 1942–1945: Albert Gorter
- 1945–1954: Karl Max von Hellingrath
- 1954–1964: Alfred Jamin
- 1964–1971: Rudolf Eberhard

== See also ==
- Bayerische Hypotheken- und Wechsel-Bank
- Bayerische Vereinsbank
- Bayerische Notenbank
- Prussian State Bank
- List of banks in Germany
