= Leuchtenberg Gallery =

Art museum in Munich, Germany

Coordinates: 48°8′39.28″N 11°34′39.17″E

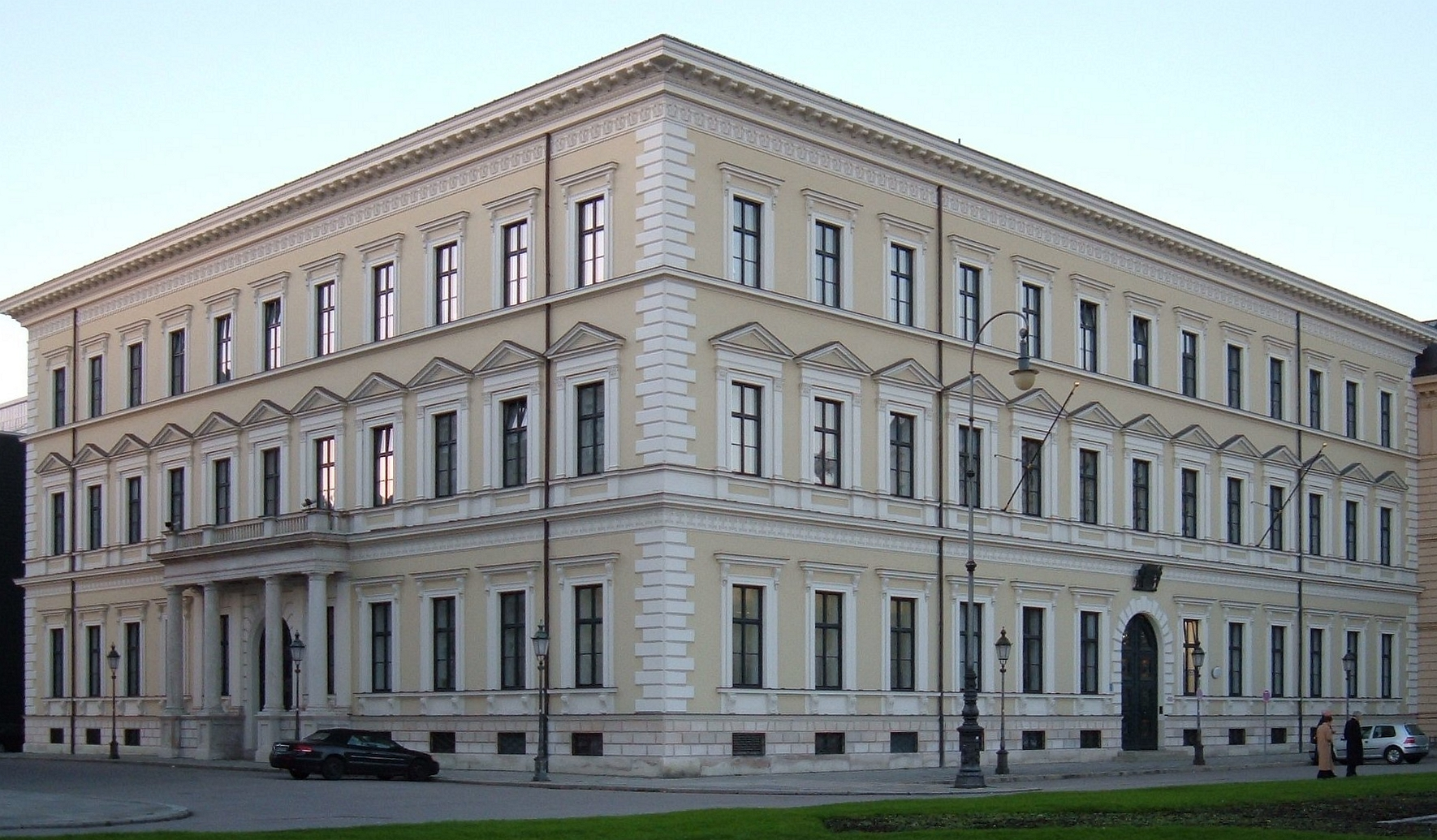
Outside view of the Palais Leuchtenberg, a 1960s reconstruction of the original palace which was ruined in the Second World War. The Gallery was located at the first floor.

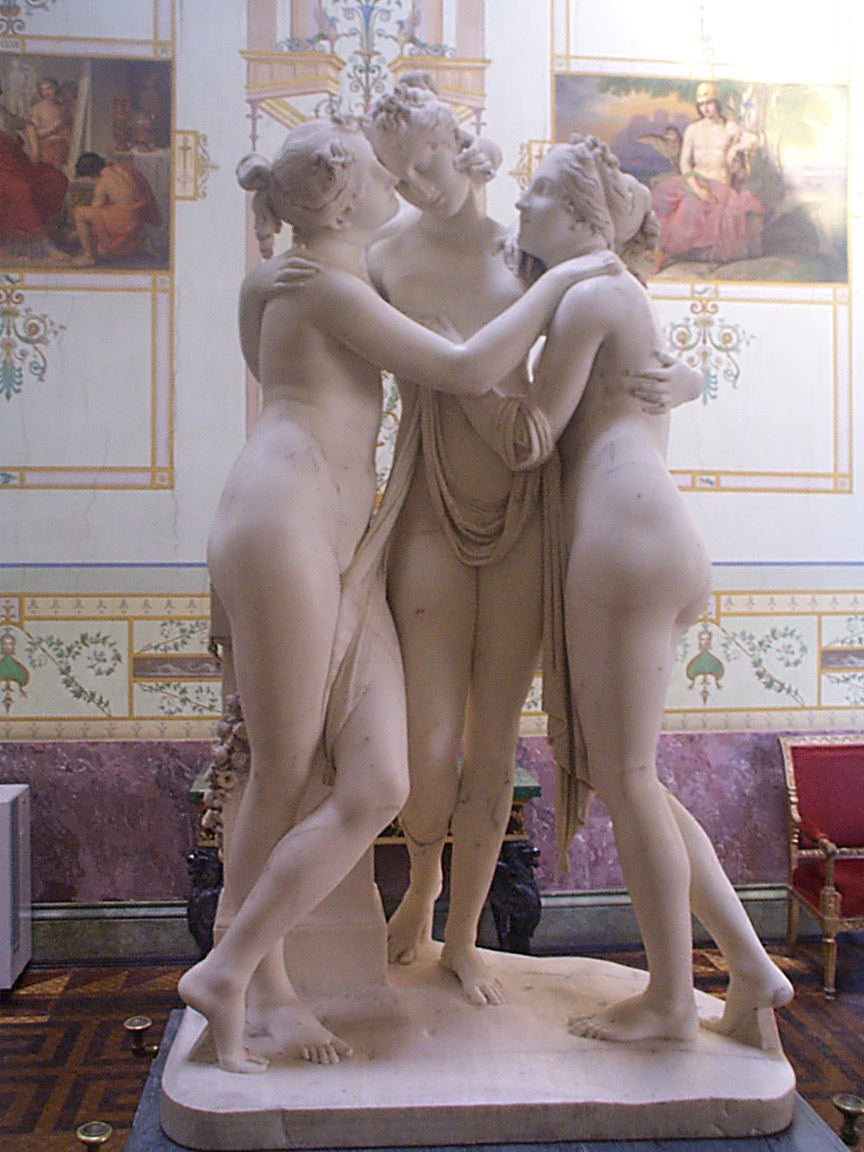
The Three Graces by Antonio Canova, once a highlight of the Leuchtenberg Gallery, now in the Hermitage Museum in Saint-Petersburg, Russia

The Leuchtenberg Gallery was the collection of artworks of the Dukes of Leuchtenberg, on public display in Munich. The collection was widely known in 19th-century Europe, due to being open to the public and having a high-quality illustrated catalogue in different languages, and was considered one of the most important private collections of the time. The collection was a heritage from Napoleonic times through Joséphine de Beauharnais, but with new additions by the subsequent Dukes, especially Eugène de Beauharnais. In 1810, Eugène de Beauharnais bought part of the collection of Giovanni Francesco Arese, including at least one painting by Peter Paul Rubens. By 1841, the collection was largely complete.

The Gallery was located in the Palais Leuchtenberg, the house of the Leuchtenberg family in Munich, built by Leo von Klenze between 1817 and 1821. It was opened to the public from at least 1837 on. The collection was catalogued in French and German from 1825 on, with a new version in German from 1841 on, and in an illustrated catalogue in English in 1852. After the death of Duke Maximilian in 1852, the Gallery was closed, the collection divided between his children, and the Palace sold to Luitpold, Prince Regent of Bavaria. Part of the collection was transferred to Saint Petersburg in 1854, where it was displayed in the Mariinsky Palace, and from 1870 on was lent to the Imperial Academy of Arts. The remainder moved together with Eugen Maximilianovich, Duke of Leuchtenberg, from Munich to Saint Petersburg in 1863. While the collection was still growing in the 1860s with purchases by Grand Duchess Maria Nikolaevna of Russia, by the end of the century, some works were being sold off. The majority of the collection remained together until the Russian Revolution in 1917, when it was dispersed and a number of paintings sold in Sweden. Many works were acquired by the Hermitage and the Pushkin Museum, with others ending up in museums all over the world. For example, Parmigianino's Circumcision of Jesus is now housed at the Detroit Institute of Arts. The remaining works are either lost or in private collections.

== Collection ==
This is the full collection from the 1852 catalogue of the Gallery, listed with the most common modern name for the artists instead of the names used in the catalogue. In addition, some works present in the 1826 or 1841 catalogues but not in the 1852 catalogue have been included. Where known, the most recent attribution and current location of the work have been noted. The first appearance of a work in an older catalogue of the Gallery has also been indicated. This includes the 1826 and expanded 1841 German language catalogues.

=== Paintings ===
Painter	Nationality	Work	Current attribution	Current location	Notes	First noted	Image
Andreas Achenbach and Joseph Andreas Weiss	German	Storm at sea: harbour of Hoegameos in Sweden				1841	
Albrecht Adam	German	Attack by French cavalry				1826	
Albrecht Adam	German	Outposts of French horse artillery				1826	
Albrecht Adam	German	Two French cuirassiers saving a wounded officer				1826	
Albrecht Adam	German	French battery defended against Austrian Hussars				1826	
Albrecht Adam	German	Battle of the Moscowa: death of general Caulincourt				1826	
Francesco Albani	Italian	Jupiter, in the shape of a bull, carrying off Europa	Francesco Albani		Auctioned (but not sold) in Sweden in 2012 with an estimated value of about €300,000	1826	
Francesco Albani	Italian	Venus awaiting Adonis				1841	
Francesco Albani	Italian	Venus adorned by the Graces				1841	
Baldassare Aloisi	Italian	Cupid with his bow	Pomponio Amidano		Sold at Sotheby's in 1996	1826	
Baldassare Aloisi	Italian	Portrait of a young student				1841	
Sofonisba Anguissola	Italian	Portrait of the Queen of Cyprus	Sofonisba Anguissola	lost	Later identified as a self-portrait	1826	
Andrea Appiani	Italian	Napoleon sitting on his throne	Andrea Appiani	Pushkin Museum		1826	
Andrea Appiani	Italian	Napoleon as King of Italy				1841	
Jan Asselijn	Dutch	Seaport illuminated by the setting sea	Jan Asselijn		Sold at Christie's in London in 2007 for £36,500	1826	
Ludolf Bakhuizen	Dutch	A slightly agitated sea, with ships				1826	
Fra Bartolomeo	Italian	Madonna della Misericordia				1826	
Jacopo Bassano	Italian	Christ bearing his cross				1826	
Jacopo Bassano	Italian	Stoning of St. Stephen				1826	
Gentile Bellini	Italian	Mary holding the infant saviour on her knee				1826	
Gentile Bellini	Italian	Circumcision of the infant Jesus	Vincenzo Catena	Pushkin Museum		1826	
Giovanni Bellini	Italian	The Madonna and child with a goldfinch	Pietro degli Ingannati		Sold as "Circle of Giovanni Bellini" at Christie's in 1997 for $167,500	1841	
Nicolaes Pieterszoon Berchem	Dutch	Summer evening: Italian herdsmen with cattle				1826	
Nicolaes Pieterszoon Berchem	Dutch	Travellers and herdsmen at a stream				1826	
Nicolaes Pieterszoon Berchem	Dutch	Shepherd's boy and shepherdesses with cattle				1826	
Johan Christian Berger	Swedish	Entrance to the harbour of Calmar, in Sweden				1841	
Jean-Joseph-Xavier Bidauld	French	Rocky landscape and mountain stream				1826	
Carlo Bononi	Italian	The sons of Jacob bringing to him the bloodstained garment of Joseph				1826	
Paris Bordone	Italian	Christ taking leave of his mother	Paris Bordone	Philadelphia Museum of Art		1826	
Paris Bordone	Italian	Hilly landscape, with St. Jerome and a lion	Paris Bordone	Philadelphia Museum of Art		1841	
Giuseppe Bossi	Italian	Last supper (copy of the work by Leonardo da Vinci)				1826	
Bronzino	Italian	Portrait of Laura Battiferri	Bronzino	Palazzo Vecchio in Florence		1826	
Bronzino	Italian	Pieta: the corpse of Christ on the lap of Mary				1826	
François Boucher	French	Cupid discharging an arrow				1826	
Pieter Bruegel the Elder	Flemish	Landscape with travellers				1841	
Heinrich Bürkel	German	Winter landscape with village church				1841	
Butz (?), after Joseph Karl Stieler	German	Portrait of His Royal Highness, Prince Eugene, Duke of Leuchtenberg				1841	
Canaletto	Italian	A square in Venice				1826	
Canaletto	Italian	Church of S. Giorgio Maggiore in Venice				1841	
Simone Cantarini	Italian	The rest on the flight into Egypt	Simone Cantarini		Sold at Christie's in 1992 for $37,400	1826	
Giovanni Francesco Caroto	Italian	Three saints: Roch, Anthony Abbot, and Lucy	Cima da Conegliano	Metropolitan Museum of Art		1826	
Annibale Carracci	Italian	Burial of Christ	Annibale Carracci	Metropolitan Museum of Art		1826	
Annibale Carracci	Italian	John the Baptist sitting by the side of a river				1826	
Joseph Charles Cogels	Flemish	Old port of Antwerp				1826	
Joseph Charles Cogels	Flemish	New quay at Antwerp				1826	
Cima da Conegliano	Italian	Madonna and child	Cima da Conegliano	Hermitage		1852	
Carl Conjola	German	A mountainous region with a wild sow			Not in the 1852 catalogue	1826	
Antonio da Correggio	Italian	The Holy Virgin kneeling before the Infant Christ				1841	
Antonio da Correggio (school of)	Italian	A young man, dressed in black, sits at a writing table			Not in the 1852 catalogue	1826	
Giuseppe Crespi	Italian	A card party			In 1841 attributed to Daniele Crespi	1841	
Aelbert Cuyp	Dutch	Fruit piece				1826	
Jan Frans van Dael	Flemish	Flower piece	Jan Frans van Dael	Pushkin Museum (as Offering to Flora)		1826	
Jan Frans van Dael	Flemish	Fruit piece	Jan Frans van Dael	Pushkin Museum		1826	
Jan Frans van Dael	Flemish	Spring flowers in a stone vase				1826	
Jan Frans van Dael	Flemish	Bunch of blue grapes				1826	
Jacques-Louis David	French	Brutus after pronouncing sentence of death on his sons			A preparatory sketch for The Lictors Bring to Brutus the Bodies of His Sons	1826	
Cornelis Gerritsz Decker	Dutch	Fishermen's huts near a river				1826	
Jean-Louis de Marne	French	Cattle market, with many figures				1826	
Balthasar Denner	German	Head of an old lady				1841	
Cantius Dillis	German	View near Nesselau in the Bavarian Highlands				1826	
Cantius Dillis	German	Stone bridge near the mill at Andorf				1826	
Johann Georg von Dillis	German	Mill near a waterfall				1826	
Simon van der Does	Dutch	Shepherd's family and flock, resting under high trees	Jacob van der Does		Sold at Kinsky Auktionen, Vienna, in 2007	1826	
Carlo Dolci	Italian	Saint John the Evangelist	Carlo Dolci		Sold at Christie's in 2007 for $289,000	1826	
Domenichino	Italian	Saint Sebastian, tied to a tree and pierced by arrows				1826	
Domenichino	Italian	Landscape: God appearing to Moses in the burning bush				1826	
Domenichino	Italian	Landscape: an angel meeting Balaam on his ass				1826	
Johann Jakob Dorner the Younger	German	Sawing-mill on a rapidly flowing mountain river				1826	
Johann Jakob Dorner the Younger	German	Waterfall near a mill: stormy weather				1826	
Johann Jakob Dorner the Younger	German	Waterfall near a sawing-mill				1841	
Dosso Dossi	Italian	A conjurer performing at a table	Dosso Dossi	Pushkin Museum		1841	
Gerrit Dou	Dutch	A physician looking at a urinal				1841	
Anthony van Dyck	Flemish	Portrait of Marquis Ambrogio Spinola	Peter Paul Rubens (studio of)	Saint Louis Art Museum		1826	
Anthony van Dyck	Flemish	Portrait of a man				1826	
Anthony van Dyck	Flemish	Children of Charles I, king of England				1826	
Anthony van Dyck	Flemish	Portrait of the celebrated artist, Sophonisba Anguisciola				1826	
Allaert van Everdingen	Dutch	Rocky scene in Norway				1826	
Carl Johan Fahlcrantz	Swedish	View of the castle of Leckoe				1841	
Carl Johan Fahlcrantz	Swedish	The harbour of Stockholm				1841	
Thomas Fearnley	Norwegian	View of Stockholm, from Kungsholmen				1841	
Gaudenzio Ferrari	Italian	The holy family: Mary with the infant Jesus, Joseph, and St. John				1826	
Gaudenzio Ferrari	Italian	The Lord's supper				1841	
François Fleury-Richard	French	Valentine of Milan weeping for the death of her husband Louis of Orléans	François Fleury-Richard	Hermitage	It came into the Leuchtenberg collection through Empress Josephine, who had acquired the work in 1805. The work was last seen in 1904 and considered lost afterwards, until it reappeared in 1998.	1826	
François Fleury-Richard	French	King Charles VII, on his departure for battle, writing to Agnes Sorel				1826	
François Fleury-Richard	French	The Duchess de la Vallière in the Nunnery of the Carmelites				1826	
François Fleury-Richard	French	Henry IV presenting some sweetmeats to the Duke of Bellegarde, who has hidden himself under the bed of Gabrielle d'Estrées				1826	
Lavinia Fontana	Italian	Nuptials of St. Catherine				1826	
Louis Nicolas Philippe Auguste de Forbin	French	Cloister church at Coimbra: coronation of Inez de Castro				1826	
Louis Nicolas Philippe Auguste de Forbin	French	Ossian singing the deeds of departed heroes				1826	
Henri Jean-Baptiste Victoire Fradelle	French	Interior of the church of St. Ambrosius, Milan				1826	
Henri Jean-Baptiste Victoire Fradelle	French	Peasant from Béarn presenting Henry IV with cheese				1826	
Marcantonio Franceschini	Italian	The Triumph of Venus	Marcantonio Franceschini		Sold at Christie's in 2006 for £72,000	1826	
Maria Elektrine von Freyberg	German	The holy virgin and infant Christ				1841	
Maria Elektrine von Freyberg	German	The three Maries at the tomb of Christ				1826	
François Gérard	French	Portrait of empress Joséphine	François Gérard	Hermitage		1841	
François Gérard	French	Belisarius	François Gérard	unknown	A smaller study for this work is currently in the J. Paul Getty Museum, but the current location of this finished version is unknown	1826	
Marguerite Gérard	French	Mother kissing her child	Marguerite Gérard	Pushkin Museum		1826	
Giorgione	Italian	Herodias receiving the head of St. John the Baptist				1826	
Giorgione	Italian	Christ in the lap of his mother				1826	
Giorgione	Italian	Adoration of the shepherds				1826	
Anne-Louis Girodet de Roussy-Trioson	French	The apotheosis of the French heroes			Not in the 1852 catalogue	1826	
François Marius Granet	French	The painter Jacques Stella in prison	François Marius Granet	Pushkin Museum		1826	
Jean-Baptiste Greuze	French	A girl in the attitude of supplication	Jean-Baptiste Greuze		Sold at Sotheby's in 2007 for $78,000	1826	
Guercino	Italian	Portrait of a Lawyer	Guercino		Sold in 2004 at Sotheby's as the Portrait of Francesco Righetti, for £431,200	1826	
Guercino	Italian	The woman taken in adultery				1826	
Guercino	Italian	St. Jerome startled by the sound of an angel's trumpet	Guercino	Pushkin Museum		1826	
Pierre-Narcisse Guérin	French	Anacreon and Cupid				1826	
Hortense Haudebourt-Lescot	French	A little Savoyard playing several instruments at once				1826	
Jan Davidsz. de Heem	Dutch	Group of fruit				1826	
Carl Wilhelm von Heideck	German	Winter landscape: a countryman carrying wood on a sledge				1826	
Carl Wilhelm von Heideck	German	Attack by a regiment of French cuirassiers				1826	
Carl Wilhelm von Heideck	German	The Duke of Leuchtenberg rescuing Col. Klisky at Lowicz				1841	
Carl Wilhelm von Heideck	German	A countryman driving a load of hay				1826	
Louis Hersent	French	Fénélon restoring to poor peasants a cow taken by the enemy				1826	
Heinrich Maria von Hess	German	Faith, Love, and Hope, sitting under an oak	Heinrich Maria von Hess	Hermitage		1826	
Peter von Hess	German	Village of Partenkirchen and Mount Zugspitze	Peter von Hess	Hermitage		1826	
Peter von Hess	German	Cossacks preparing to surprise a French outpost				1826	
Peter von Hess	German	Bivouac of Polish cavalry				1826	
Jan van der Heyden	Dutch	Country house by the side of a river				1841	
Meindert Hobbema	Dutch	A village church in an oak forest				1826	
Hans Holbein the Elder	German	Portrait of St. Thomas More				1841	
Hans Holbein the Younger	German	A man and woman at a table with viands				1826	
Gijsbert d' Hondecoeter	Dutch	Two domestic cocks and two hens	Gijsbert d' Hondecoeter		For sale at Sotheby's in 2008	1826	
Melchior d' Hondecoeter	Dutch	A hen, chickens and cock defending themselves against a turkey				1826	
Pieter de Hooch	Dutch	Interior of a Dutch room, with a lady reading a paper				1826	
Pieter de Hooch	Dutch	A man offering a glass of wine to a woman	Pieter de Hooch	Hermitage		1852	
Jan van Huysum	Dutch	Flowers in an ornamented vase				1826	
Ludolf Leendertsz de Jongh	Dutch	Huntsmen taking refreshments in a Dutch farmhouse				1826	
Jan Kobell	Dutch	Pasture ground: a herdsman milking a cow			Sold in Munich in 1933 at Hugo Helbing auction house.	1826	
Wilhelm von Kobell	German	View of the city of Munich, from the east				1826	
Wilhelm von Kobell	German	Huntsman on horseback speaking to a countrywoman at the roadside				1826	
Joseph Anton Koch	Austrian	The San Francesco di Civitella monastery	Joseph Anton Koch	Hermitage		1841	
Aleksander Lauréus	Finnish	Italian country people in a tavern			Listed as "Alexander Laurens" in the 1852 catalogue	1826	
Johan le Ducq	Dutch	A knight surveying the cleaning of his armour				1826	
Johan le Ducq	Dutch	A convivial party of Dutch ladies and gentlemen				1826	
Hendrick van Limborch	Dutch	Artemisia II, Queen of Caris, taking poison	Hendrick van Limborch		Sold in 2000 at Phillips auction house for £5,000	1841	
Johannes Lingelbach	Dutch	Italian seaport, ships being loaded and unloaded				1826	
Lorenzo Lotto	Italian	St Catherine of Alexandria	Lorenzo Lotto	National Gallery of Art		1826	
Bernardino Luini	Italian	The Madonna of the Carnation	Bernardino Luini	National Gallery of Art		1841	
Bernardino Luini	Italian	Mary with the infant Jesus and St. John				1826	
Bernardino Luini	Italian	St. Jerome under a tree contemplating a skull				1826	
Carlo Maratta	Italian	The reposo on the flight to Egypt				1841	
Masaccio	Italian	Portrait of the artist himself	Sandro Botticelli	Museo del Prado		1826	
Vicente Juan Masip	Spanish	Adoration of the shepherds				1826	
Theodor Mattenheimer	German	Flower piece with fruits			Not present in the 1852 catalogue	1826	
Ludovico Mazzolino	Italian	The corpse of Christ lamented over by his family				1826	
Hans Memling	Flemish	John the Baptist directing the attention of a devotee to Christ	Dieric Bouts	Alte Pinakothek		1841	
Gabriël Metsu	Dutch	A sick woman, presented with a basket by her maid	Gabriël Metsu	Gemäldegalerie, Berlin		1826	
Adam Frans van der Meulen	Flemish	Cavalry combat at the entrance to a forest	Adam Frans van der Meulen (attributed to)		Sold by Sotheby's in 1996	1826	
Frans van Mieris the Elder	Dutch	Girl restoring a bird to liberty				1841	
Frans van Mieris the Elder	Dutch	Garden terrace, with a lady and gentleman walking				1841	
Willem van Mieris	Dutch	Poulterer in his shop speaking to girl				1826	
Giovanni Migliara	Italian	Exterior of the cathedral at Milan				1826	
Giovanni Migliara	Italian	Interior of the cathedral at Milan				1826	
Francisque Millet	Flemish	Landscape: Christ and the Samaritan woman at the well				1826	
Moretto da Brescia	Italian	The virgin Mary holding the infant Jesus				1826	
Moretto da Brescia	Italian	Portrait of a young man				1841	
Giovanni Battista Moroni	Italian	Holy Family with a husband and wife as donors	Dosso Dossi	Philadelphia Museum of Art		1826	
Bartolomé Esteban Murillo	Spanish	The boy Jesus as the good shepherd				1826	
Bartolomé Esteban Murillo	Spanish	The holy virgin holding the infant Jesus				1826	
Bartolomé Esteban Murillo	Spanish	The guardian angel adminishing a Carthusian to accept an episcopal dignity				1826	
Bartolomé Esteban Murillo	Spanish	Mary Magdalen				1841	
Adriaen van Ostade	Dutch	Peasants smoking before a rural habitation				1826	
Balthasar Paul Ommeganck	Flemish	Sheep and goats reposing				1826	
Isaac van Ostade	Dutch	Landscape, with a tavern, the company listening to a piper				1826	
Palma Vecchio	Italian	Sacra Conversazione	Palma Vecchio	Thyssen-Bornemisza Museum		1826	
Parmigianino	Italian	Circumcision of Jesus	Parmigianino	Detroit Institute of Arts		1826	
Parmigianino	Italian	The Madonna and Child with Saints Catherine and Francis	Francesco Brizio		Sold at Sotheby's in 2006 for $120,000	1841	
Parmigianino	Italian	The holy family				1826	
Joseph Parrocel	French	Louis XIV, besieging the town of Namur				1841	
Gianfrancesco Penni	Italian	Christ and the Samaritan woman at the well				1826	
Sebastiano del Piombo	Italian	Mary with the infant Christ and little St. John, sitting, surrounded by Zacharias, Jacob, and the great Christopher				1826	
Cornelius van Poelenburgh	Dutch	Repose on the flight to Egypt				1841	
Il Pordenone	Italian	The holy family				1826	
Paulus Potter	Dutch	Two horses in a field				1841	
Frans Pourbus the Younger	Flemish	Portrait of a man with a beard				1826	
Nicolas Poussin	French	Finding of the infant Moses				1841	
Nicolas Poussin	French	Landscape: Orpheus with Nympha				1826	
Camillo Procaccini	Italian	Portrait of the painter, by himself				1826	
Giulio Cesare Procaccini	Italian	A female saint, supported by two angels, receiving baptism	Giulio Cesare Procaccini		Sold at Sotheby's in 2002 for $170,750	1826	
Giulio Cesare Procaccini	Italian	The burial of Christ				1826	
Adam Pynacker	Dutch	Pasture ground, with cattle				1826	
Domenico Quaglio the Elder	Italian	Town of Neuoettingen on the river Inn, Bavaria				1841	
Domenico Quaglio the Elder	Italian	Exterior of the cathedral at Como				1826	
Lorenzo Quaglio	Italian	A young lady leaves a Gothic church and gives alms			Not in the 1852 catalogue	1826	
Simon Quaglio	Italian	Interior of the church of the Cistercian monastery of Erbach				1841	
Francesco Raibolini	Italian	The holy virgin with the infant Jesus, St. Dominic and St. Barbara				1826	
Raphael (school of)	Italian	Saint George fighting with the dragon		lost	Copy of the same work in the Louvre	1826	
Raphael (school of)	Italian	Saint Michael fighting the demon		lost	Copy of the same work in the Louvre	1826	
Raphael	Italian	Portrait of a cardinal				1826	
Rembrandt	Dutch	Portrait of the artist by himself	Rembrandt (disputed, but often considered to be a genuine Rembrandt)	Thyssen-Bornemisza Museum in Madrid		1826	
Guido Reni	Italian	Cupid lying on the sea-shore, attracted by two nymphs		lost		1826	
Guido Reni	Italian	The circumcision of Christ				1826	
Guido Reni	Italian	The assumption of the virgin				1826	
Juan Ribalta	Spanish	Hercules with Omphale's distaff				1826	
Juan Ribalta	Spanish	River gods and nymphs resting on a beach				1826	
Juan Ribalta	Spanish	The holy family				1841	
Joseph Anton Romberg	German	The hay harvest			Not in the 1852 catalogue	1826	
Willem Romeyn	Dutch	Italian landscape, with herdsman and cattle				1826	
Salvator Rosa	Italian	Seaport illumined by the setting sun				1826	
Christian Ruben	German	A priest carrying the sanctissimum surprised by robbers in a rocky defile				1841	
Peter Paul Rubens	Flemish	The infant Christ giving a benediction	Peter Paul Rubens (school of)	Hermitage		1826	
Peter Paul Rubens	Flemish	David beheading the giant Goliath	Peter Paul Rubens	Norton Simon Foundation		1826	
Peter Paul Rubens	Flemish	Portrait of a man				1841	
Peter Paul Rubens	Flemish	Monkeys holding a court martial				1826	
Jacob Isaakszoon van Ruisdael	Dutch	View of Alkmaar	Jacob Isaakszoon van Ruisdael	Museum of Fine Arts, Boston		1826	
Jacob Isaakszoon van Ruisdael	Dutch	Evening landscape: sportsman shooting ducks				1826	
Jacob Isaakszoon van Ruisdael	Dutch	A sportsman shooting ducks on a marshy forest water				1826	
Salaì	Italian	Mary sitting on the lap of St. Anna, holds the infant Jesus on a lamb	Salaì (attributed to)	Hammer Museum		1826	
Salviute	Italian	Magnificent building in a garden			Unknown which painter is meant with this designation; not in the 1852 catalogue	1826	
Andrea del Sarto	Italian	Portrait of man with a beard				1826	
Giovanni Battista Salvi da Sassoferrato	Italian	The holy virgin with her hands folded				1826	
Giovanni Battista Salvi da Sassoferrato	Italian	The holy virgin holding the sleeping infant Jesus to her bosom				1826	
Giovanni Battista Salvi da Sassoferrato	Italian	The holy virgin holds standing before her the infant Christ, who embraces her				1826	
Bartolomeo Schedoni	Italian	A young man giving alms to a young mother with her child				1826	
Andrea Schiavone	Italian	The holy family				1826	
Michael Johann Schnitzler	German	Two nut-peckers				1826	
Michael Johann Schnitzler	German	Two green peaks				1826	
Cesare da Sesto	Italian	The holy virgin holding on her lap the infant Jesus				1826	
Elisabetta Sirani	Italian	The holy virgin holds the infant Christ who presents to little St. John a cross of reeds				1826	
Antonio Solario	Italian	The virgin Mary holds standing before her the infant saviour, who turned to St. John, holds a bird by a thread	Antonio Solario	National Gallery		1841	
Hendrik Martenszoon Sorgh	Dutch	Interior of a Dutch farm-house, with people at table				1826	
Jan Steen	Dutch	A man and his wife giving supper to their boy and girl, the latter of whom is saying Grace		National Gallery		1826	
Bernardo Strozzi	Italian	An old man tuning a mandolin to a violin which a young man is playing				1841	
Nicolas Antoine Taunay	French	Seaport of Leon				1826	
Antonio Tempesta	Italian	Repose of the holy family on their flight to Egypt				1826	
David Teniers the Elder	Flemish	St. Jerome in the dream of a cardinal, sitting in a rocky cave, is interrupted in his reading by the sound of the trumpet of an angel				1826	
David Teniers the Younger	Flemish	A peasant's room in the Netherlands, with card playing				1826	
Thibault	French	A wood with the temple of the nymph Egeria			Not included in the 1852 catalogue: unclear which painter is intended here	1826	
Benvenuto Tisi	Italian	Saint Nicholas of Tolentino reviving a child	Benvenuto Tisi	Metropolitan Museum of Art		1826	
Benvenuto Tisi	Italian	Saint Nicholas of Tolentino reviving the birds	Benvenuto Tisi	Metropolitan Museum of Art		1826	
Benvenuto Tisi	Italian	Christ washing the disciples' feet		unknown	Now considered a copy of the original work in the National Gallery of Art	1826	
Titian	Italian	The Madonna and Child with Saints John the Baptist and Paul	Palma Vecchio (circle of)		Sold at Christie's in 2011 for £97,250	1826	
Titian	Italian	Madonna and Child with St John the Baptist and St George	Paris Bordone	Pushkin Museum		1826	
Titian	Italian	Portrait of a man with a beard	Bonifazio Veronese		Offered for sale in 2012 by Noortman Master Paintings for $1,250,000	1841	
Titian	Italian	Diana with her nymphs in the bath				1826	
Adriaen van Utrecht	Flemish	A dead hare and wild fowls on a table				1826	
Marten van Valckenborch	Flemish	Ordination of a village church			Not in the 1852 catalogue	1841	
César van Loo	French	View of the hotel at Novalaise at the foot of Mount Cenis, in the winter season				1826	
Charles-André van Loo	French	The artist in his studio painting the mistress of a Bashaw				1826	
Otto van Veen	Flemish	Christ bearing his cross; near him are Veronica and Joseph of Cyrene				1841	
Diego Velázquez	Spanish	Portrait of a Spanish Grandee	Bartolomé Esteban Murillo	National Gallery of Canada		1826	
Adriaen van de Velde	Dutch	A calm sea, with large and small vessels				1826	
Willem van de Velde the Younger	Dutch	A man-of-war and other ships sailing on a calm sea				1841	
Adriaen Verboom	Dutch	A stag hunt in a forest				1826	
Carle Vernet	French	The emperor Napoleon with the empress Marie Louise at a stag hunt in the forest of Compiègne	Carle Vernet	Hermitage		1826	
Claude Joseph Vernet	French	Marine piece, with vessels near high rocks				1826	
Paolo Veronese	Italian	Adoration of the Magi				1826	
Paolo Veronese	Italian	A family picture				1826	
Leonardo da Vinci (school of)	Italian	The holy virgin holds before her the infant Christ	Leonardo da Vinci (follower of)		Sold at Sotheby's in 2011	1826	
Leonardo da Vinci (school of)	Italian	A holy virgin holding a little dog before her				1826	
Simon de Vlieger	Dutch	A slightly agitated sea, with fishing boats and a frigate in full sail				1826	
Hendrick Cornelisz. van Vliet, with figures by Jan Baptist Weenix	Dutch	Interior of the church of Delft, with the tomb of William I				1841	
Max Joseph Wagenbauer	German	A cow and two goats near an Alpine well				1826	
Max Joseph Wagenbauer	German	A herdsman with four cows and a calf near a spring				1826	
Max Joseph Wagenbauer	German	A standing cow and two cows lying down			Not in the 1852 catalogue	1826	
Simon Warnberger	German	Landscape with two herdswomen near the Tegernsee			Not in the 1852 catalogue	1826	
Jan Weenix	Dutch	A dead hare and a magpie, laying by a fowling-piece, and smelt at by a dog				1826	
Jan Weenix	Dutch	Agitated seaport, with magnificent buildings, columns and obelisks			Not in the 1852 catalogue	1826	
Jean-Baptiste Wicar	French	Resuscitation of the youth at Nain				1826	
Jean-Baptiste Wicar	French	Portrait of Pope Pius VII				1841	
Jan Wijnants	Dutch	A cottage surrounded by trees, near a flowing rivulet	Jan Steen		Sold at Christie's in 2004 for €88,125	1826	
Jan Wijnants, with figures by Adriaen van de Velde	Dutch	An extensive landscape with herdsmen and cattle				1826	
Emanuel de Witte	Dutch	Interior of a Gothic church with white marble columns			Not in the 1852 catalogue	1826	
Philips Wouwerman	Dutch	A lady and gentleman, travelling on horseback, are stopping before a tavern, to refresh themselves				1826	
Philips Wouwerman	Dutch	A family of peasants resting near a haywaggon, upon which boys are playing				1826	

=== Sculptures ===
Sculptor	Nationality	Work	Current attribution	Current location	Notes	First noted	Image
Alessandro Algardi	Italian	Eros and Anteros: or, spiritual love conquering sensual love	Alessandro Algardi	Liechtenstein Museum		1826	
François Joseph Bosio	French	Cupid on the point of launching an arrow	François Joseph Bosio	Hermitage		1826	
Antonio Canova	Italian	The Three Graces	Antonio Canova	Hermitage		1826	
Antonio Canova	Italian	Kneeling Magdalen	Antonio Canova	Hermitage		1826	
Antoine-Denis Chaudet	French	Cyparissus holding his little buck which he had killed by mistake				1826	
Joseph Chinard	French	The Empress Josephine	Joseph Chinard	National Gallery of Canada		1852	
Luigi Manfredini	Italian	Bronze bust of Prince Eugene, Duke of Leuchtenberg				1841	
Luigi Manfredini	Italian	Antique female statue, probably a Spes				1852	
Luigi Manfredini	Italian	Roman antique eagle				1852	
Luigi Manfredini	Italian	A splendid tankard, ornamented with ivory figures of Bacchanale				1852	
Luigi Manfredini	Italian	Arm chair of the emperor Napoleon, used during his consulship				1852	
