= Gisbert Flüggen =

German painter

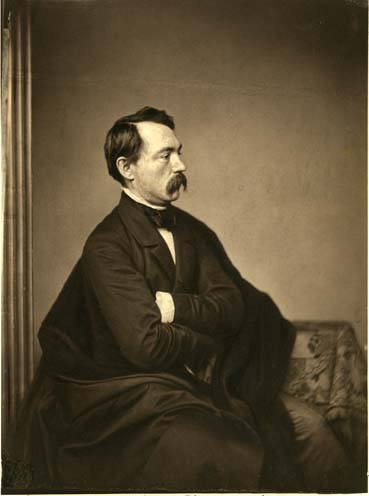
Gisbert Flüggen; photograph by Franz Hanfstaengl

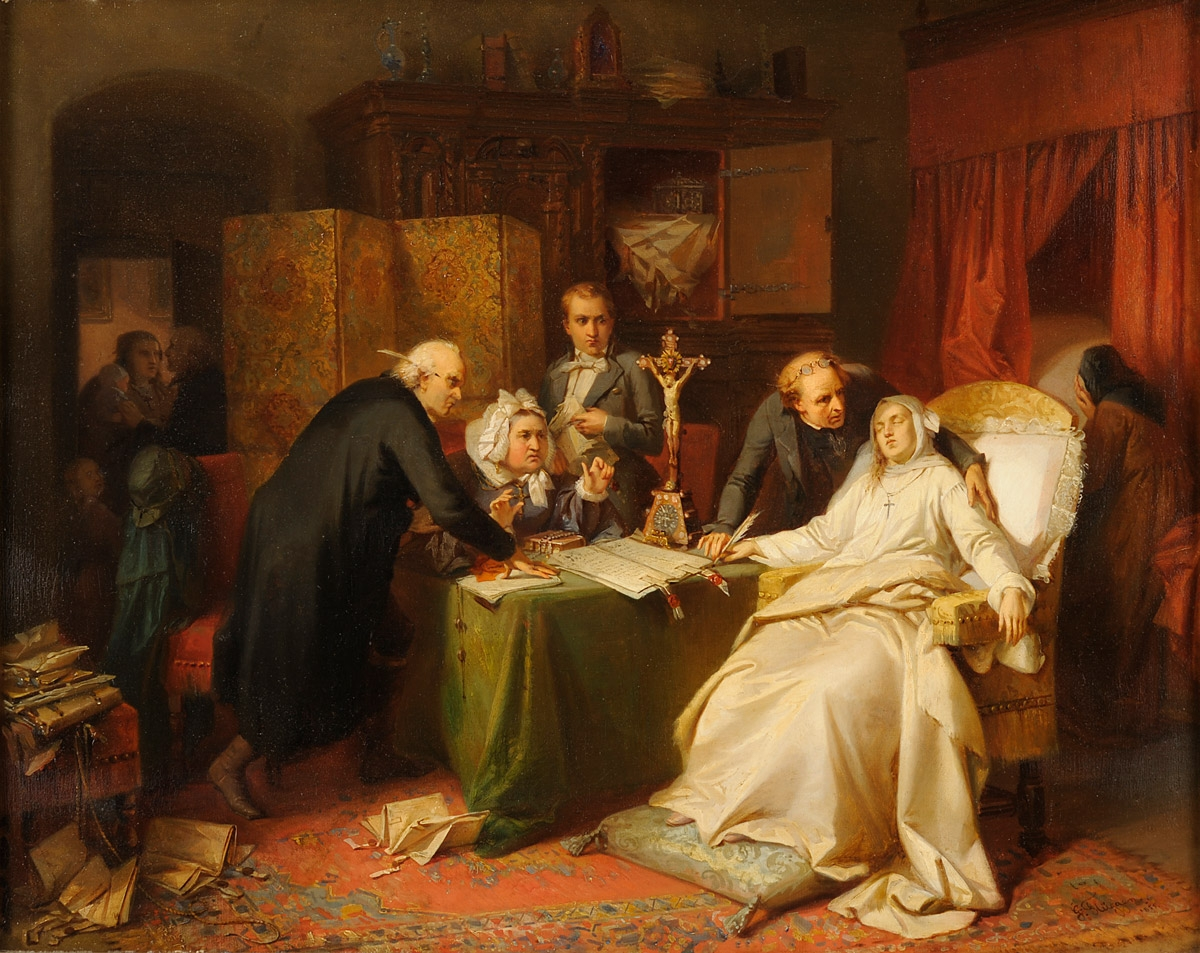
The Sneaky Heir (Stolen Inheritance)

Gisbert Hipolit August Flüggen (9 February 1811, Cologne – 3 September 1859, Munich) was a German genre painter. He was sometimes referred to as the "German Wilkie".

== Biography ==
His parents moved from Lille to Cologne just before his birth. They soon became impoverished and Gisbert was forced to work for a haberdasher as soon as he was old enough to do so. He developed an interest in art and spent his few spare hours copying works at the recently established Wallrafianum (now the Wallraf-Richartz Museum). His family was opposed to his career ambitions, but he got support from a local painter named Joseph Weber (1798-1883). Thanks to an inheritance, he was able to pursue his studies at the Kunstakademie Düsseldorf.

He spent some time in Ghent but, shortly after his marriage in Cologne, decided on Munich for his permanent residence. He became a member of the Kunstverein München and received the patronage of Luitpold, Prince Regent of Bavaria.

His studio became a stop for sightseers. His son Joseph also became a well-known painter. In 1852, he was named an honorary member of the Academy of Fine Arts. He died suddenly in 1859 and was buried at the Alter Südfriedhof. A street in the Neuhausen-Nymphenburg district of Munich has been named after him.

== Works ==
His best-known works include:

- Hanover Museum. Jacob Deceiving Isaac. 1848.
- Leuchtenberg Ducal Gallery The Chess-players.
- Madrid Gallery. The Unlucky Player. 1841.
- Munich Gallery. The Ante-chamber of a Prince. (His last, unfinished work.)

== Sources ==
=== Attribution ===
- Rines, George Edwin, ed. (1920). "Flüggen, Gisbert" . Encyclopedia Americana.
- Flüggen. In: Meyers Konversations-Lexikon. 4th edition. Volume 6, Verlag des Bibliographischen Instituts, Leipzig/Vienna 1885–1892, p. 401.
- Friedrich Pecht (1877). "Flüggen, Gisbert" . Allgemeine Deutsche Biographie (in German). Vol. 7. Leipzig: Duncker & Humblot. p. 140.
