= Stuntz =

Stuntz is a surname. Notable people with the surname include:

- Daniel Elliot Stuntz (1909–1983), American businessman
- Johann Baptist Stuntz (1753–1836), Swiss-German landscape painter
- Johnno Stuntz (1884–1917), Australian rugby league footballer
- Stephen Conrad Stuntz (1875 – 1918), American botanist and fiction author with the author citation Stuntz.
- William J. Stuntz (1958–2011), American legal scholar
