= Johann Jakob Dorner =

Johann Jakob Dorner may refer to:

- Johann Jakob Dorner the Elder (1741–1813), German painter
- Johann Jakob Dorner the Younger (1775–1852), German painter
