= Johann Dorner =

Johann Dorner may refer to:

- Johann Conrad Dorner (1809–1866), Austrian painter
- Johann Jakob Dorner (disambiguation), multiple people
