= Max Joseph Wagenbauer =

German painter

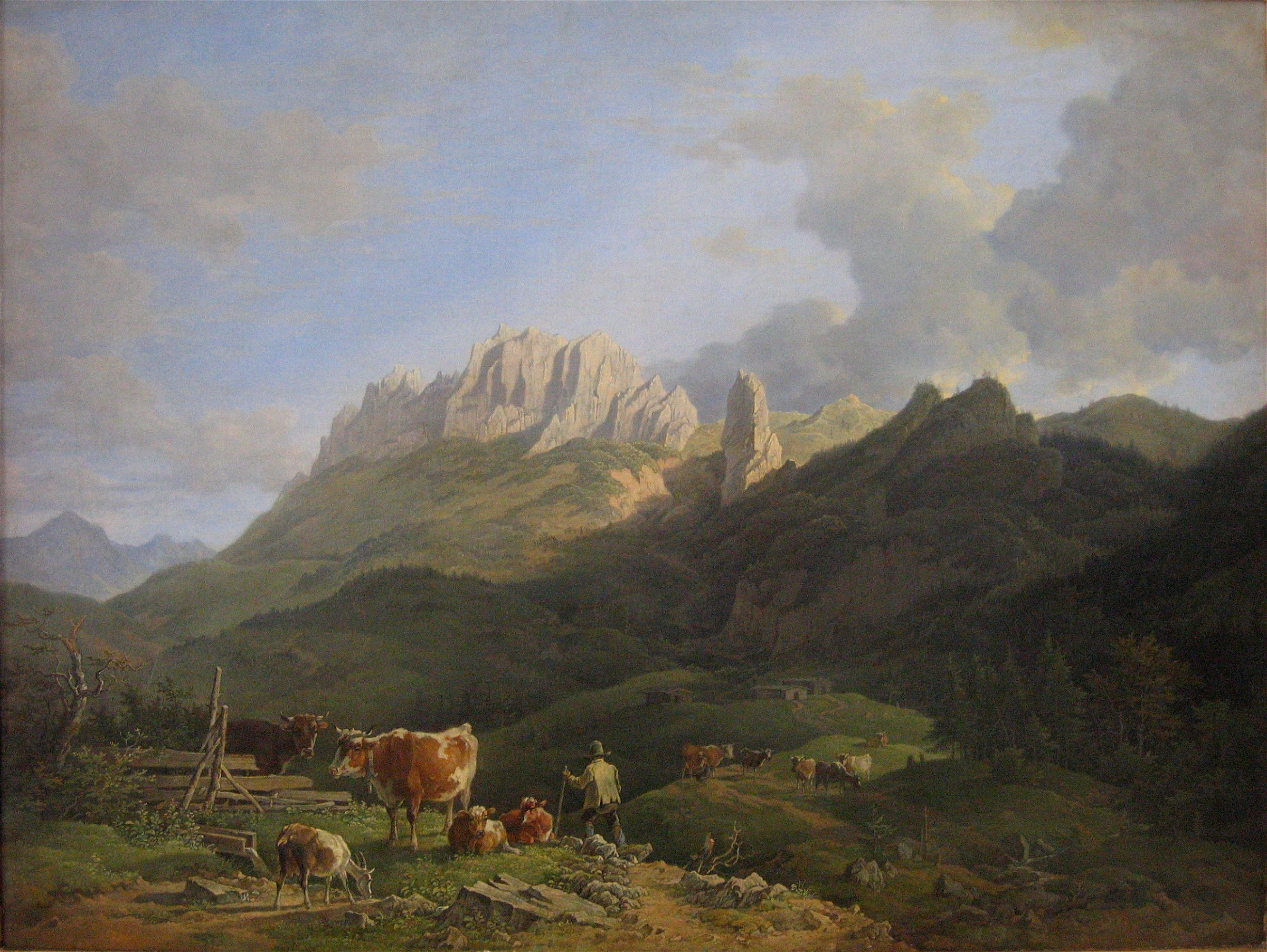

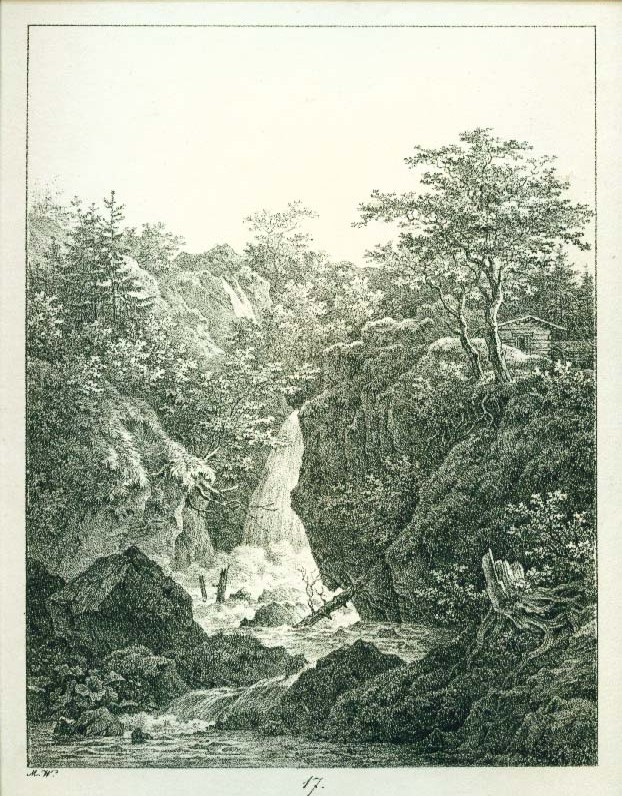

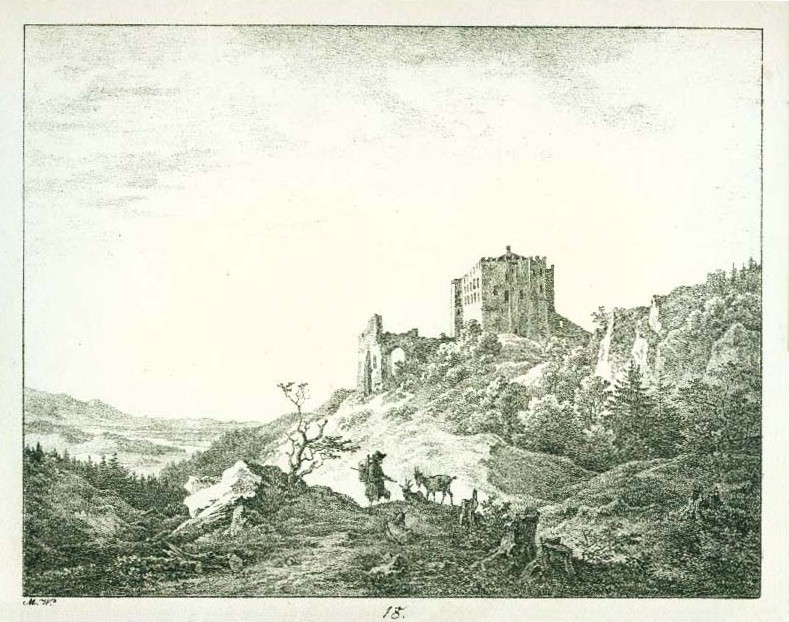

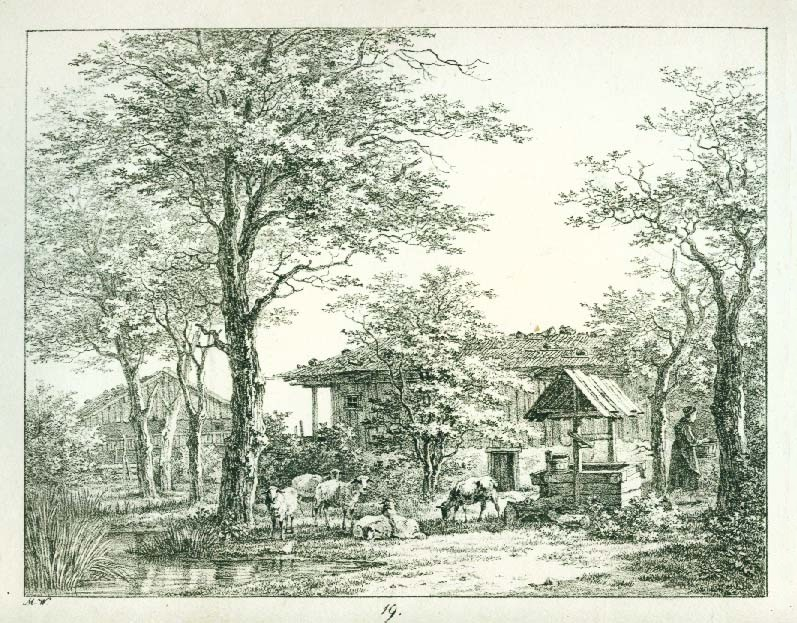

Maximilian Joseph Wagenbauer (1775 in Grafing – 1829 in Munich), was a Bavarian artist.

After finishing school, Wagenbauer attended drawing classes in Munich, under Johann Jakob Dorner the Elder (1741-1813). At the turn of the 19th century he was producing mostly Neo-Classical watercolour landscapes. He served in the military from 1797 to 1801, receiving a royal artist's annuity after his service through the influence of Johann Christian von Mannlich (1741-1822), architect and general building director of the dukes of Zweibrücken. A condition of the royal stipend was that he produce paintings. He was appointed artist to the court and cabinet in 1802 and Inspector of the Royal Paintings Gallery in 1815. Wagenbauer focused increasingly on oil painting after 1810 and enjoyed the patronage of Maximilian I Joseph of Bavaria, who in 1811 commissioned him, Cantius Dillis (1779-1856) and Johann Jakob Dorner the Younger (1775-1852) to decorate the banquet hall at Schloss Nymphenburg with large paintings of Bavarian lakes.

In 1814 Wagenbauer toured Upper Bavaria. At that time he was a member of the art academies of Hanau, Berlin and Munich. Max Wagenbauer discovered numerous areas in Bavaria. Wagenbauer's works departed from the classic tradition. He developed his own methodology where he combined careful observation with detailed study of nature, which became the cornerstones of his depictions of landscape. His paintings extolled the beauty of the Bavarian landscape, and inspired by Adriaen van de Velde and Paulus Potter, he produced a large number of animal studies. Wagenbauer also focused significantly on painting animals, a genre in which the influences of such artists as Adriaen van de Velde and Paulus Potter were evident. The genius of Wagenbauer was in the fact that even when inspired by other artists his own style was never overshadowed by theirs, thus resulting in a unique work.

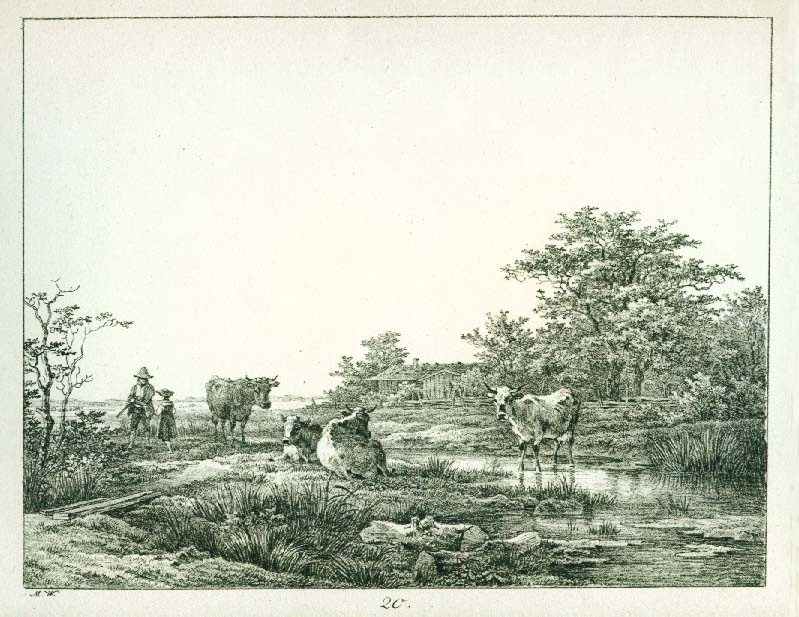
One of Wagenbauer's lithographs

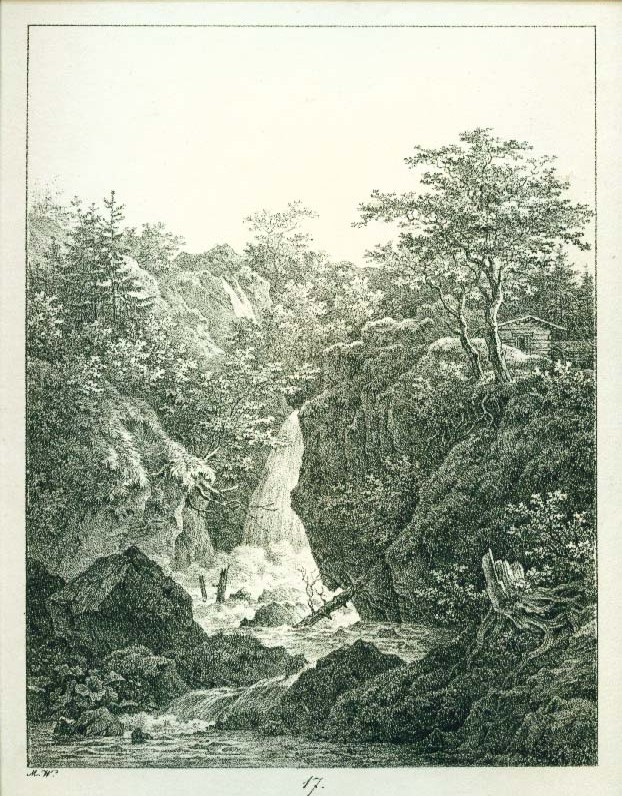
A Wagenbauer lithograph
