= Cogels =

Cogels is a surname. Notable people with the surname include:

- Fredegand Cogels (1850–1932), Belgian politician
- Joseph Charles Cogels (1786–1831), Belgian painter
- Joseph Cogels (1894–1978), Belgian sport shooter
- Anne-Antoinette Cogels (1900–1953), Belgian explorer and author
