= Carl Conjola =

German landscape painter

Carl Conjola (5 February 1773 – 19 November 1831) was a German landscape painter in watercolours and oil. He was born in Mannheim, and died in Munich.

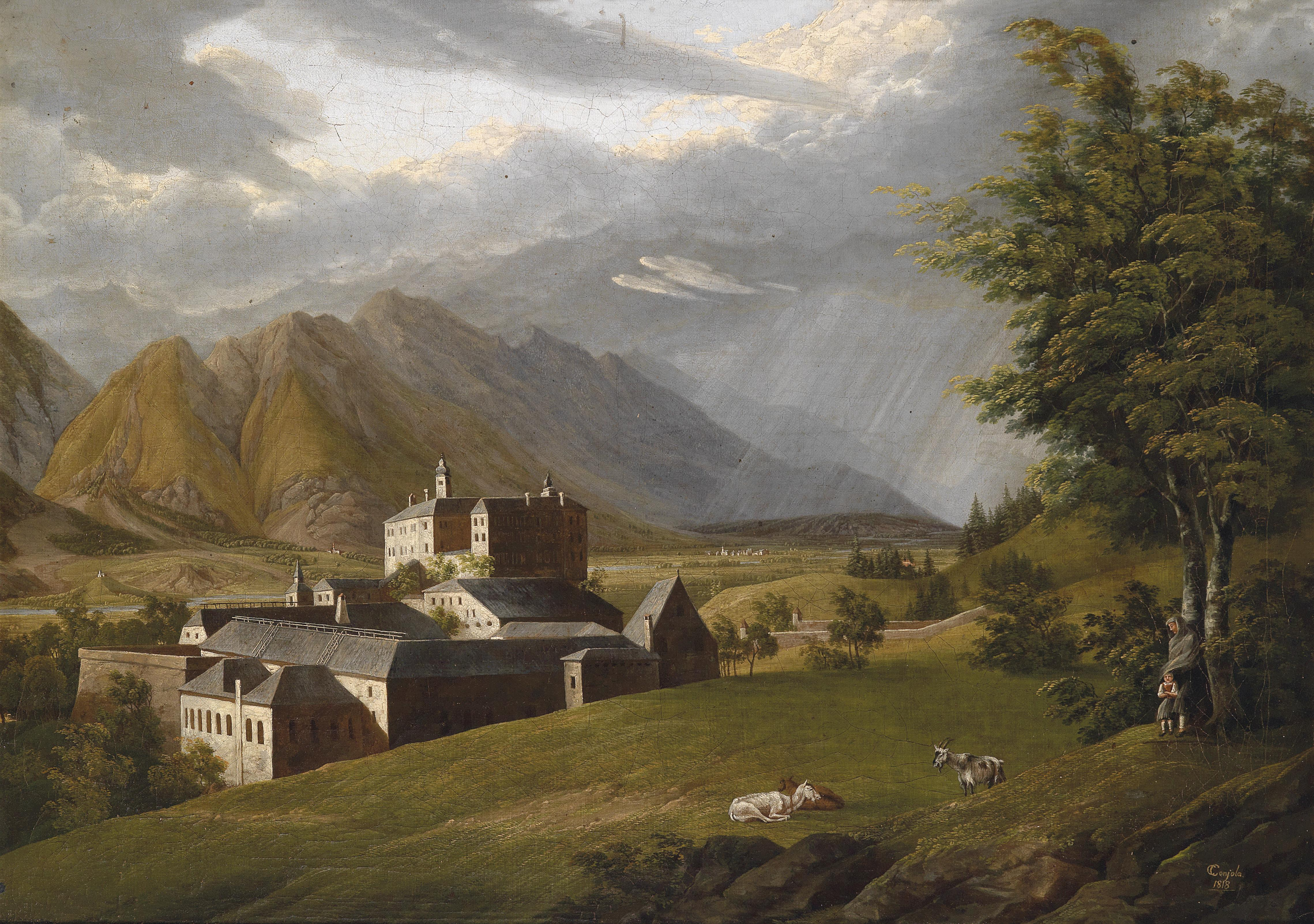
Schloss Ambras (1818)

By way of support from Charles Theodore, Elector of Bavaria, he studied painting in Munich, where he was a pupil of Jakob Dorner. He painted mainly landscapes of Bavaria, Tyrol and Switzerland.

== See also ==
- List of German painters
