= Amalia von Schattenhofer =

German artist (1763–1840)

Amalia von Schattenhofer, born Amalia Schweinhammer-Baader (1763–1840) was a German art collector and amateur painter.

Born in Erding to a physician, Georg Schewinhammer, who died when she was eight, Amalie was adopted by her stepfather, Ferdinand Maria Baader, whom her mother soon married, and whose name she took. She was a pupil of Johann Jakob Dorner the Elder, who directed the art gallery in Munich, and as part of her training she copied the Dutch and Italian paintings in the collection. In 1790, with the support of Johann Andreas Stein, she became the second honorary female member of the Augsburger Kunstakademie. Her husband was the Kanzler des Münchner Damenstiftes St. Anna. Von Schattenhofer produced a number of portraits in colored chalks and in pastel. These were engraved, as were several copies after the work of Georg Friedrich Schmidt; all were signed with the monogram "AB". Other copies, after the work of such artists as Guido Reni and Angelica Kauffman, are also known. A set of engravings is currently in the collection of the Philadelphia Museum of Art.
