= Odeon (Munich) =

Former concert hall in Munich, Germany

Coordinates: 48.143484°N 11.576801°E

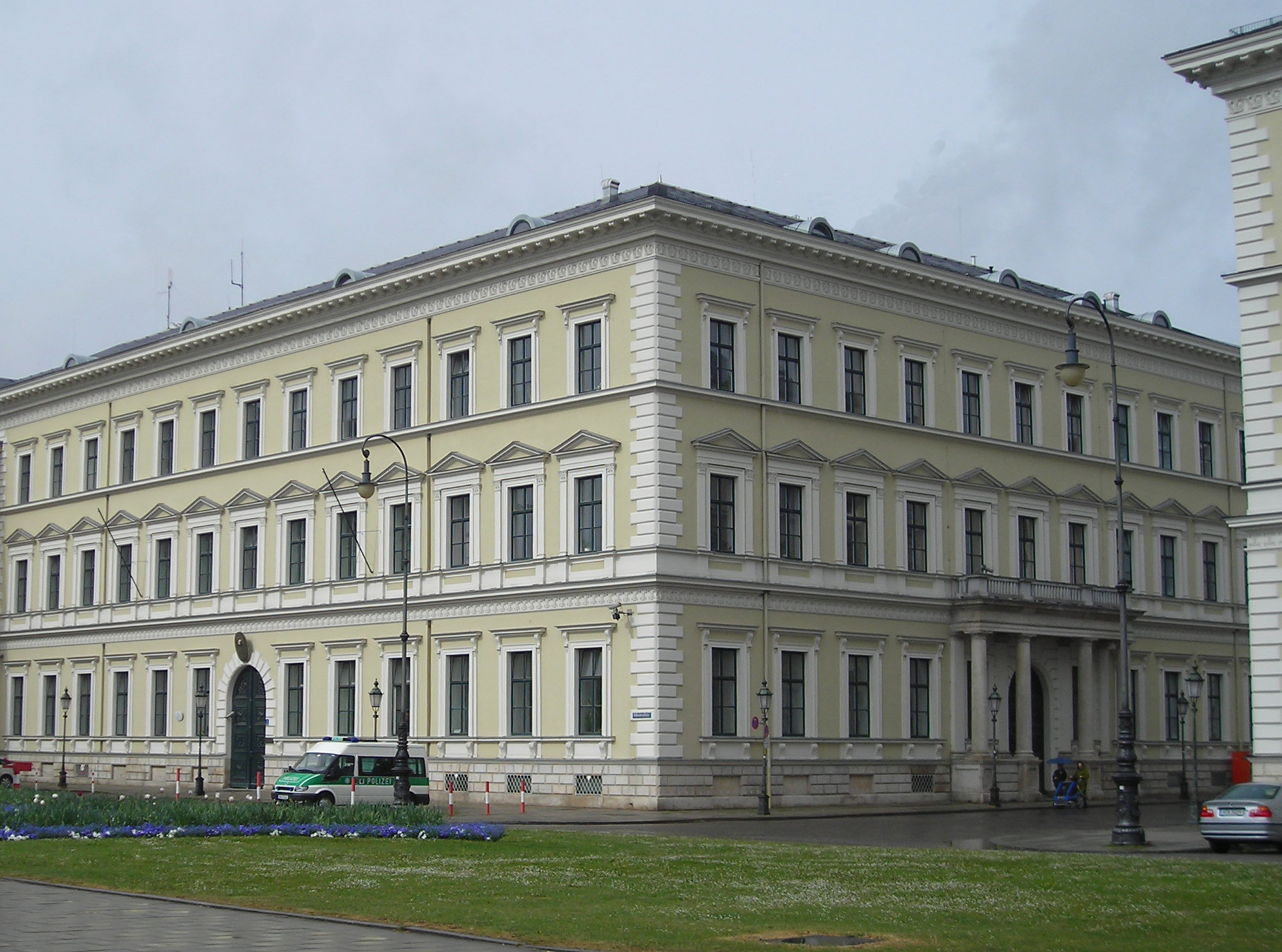
Exterior of the Odeon, from the Ludwigstraße

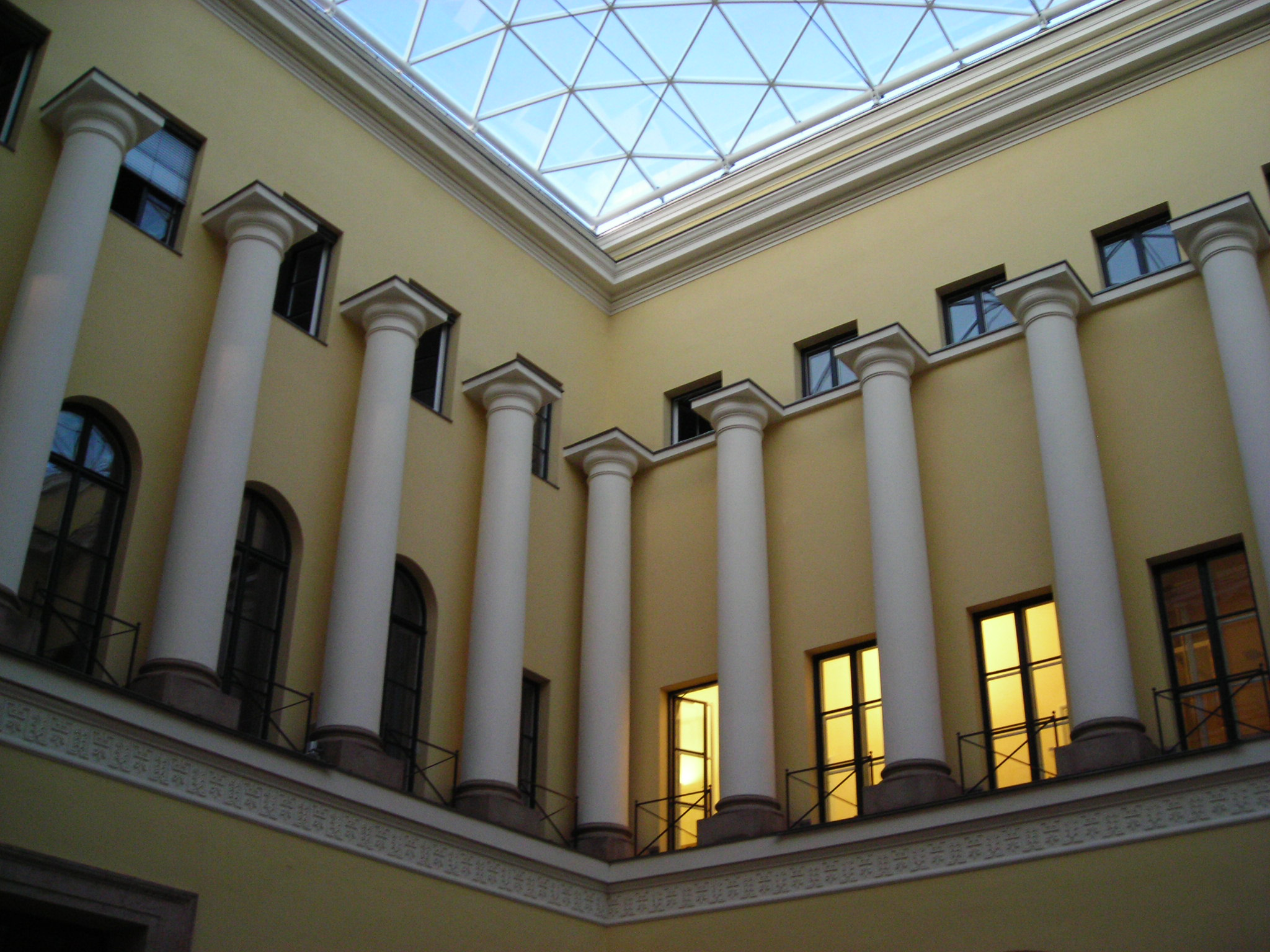
Inner courtyard, formerly the concert auditorium, after being glazed over in 2007

The Odeon is a former concert hall in the Odeonsplatz in Munich, Bavaria, Germany, which is named after it. Built in the early 19th century to a design by Leo von Klenze and forming a counterpoint to the externally identical Palais Leuchtenberg, it was rebuilt after being almost totally destroyed in World War II and now houses the Bavarian Ministry of the Interior.

== History ==
The Odeon was built in 1826–1828 on a commission from King Ludwig I of Bavaria and was originally a concert hall and ballroom. Klenze designed the exterior as an identical counterpart to that of the Palais Leuchtenberg, so that there was no outward indication of its function. The auditorium, which measured 75 by 125 feet (23 by 38 m) and seated 1,445, had two superimposed colonnades which provided access on the ground floor and a gallery with standing room, and a ceiling 50 feet (15 m) high with a skylight. The orchestra was accommodated in a semi-circular exedra, behind which in niches were busts by Johannes Leeb of the ten composers then considered most important in the history of music: Beethoven, Mozart, Gluck, Handel, Haydn, Vogler, Méhul, Weber, Cimarosa and Winter. The ceiling was decorated with frescoes in the Nazarene style: Apollo among the Muses by Wilhelm Kaulbach, Apollo among the Herdsmen by Adam Eberle and The Judgement of Midas by Hermann Anschütz. The hall, which has been called "one of the most extraordinary classical architectural solutions of the concert hall", had excellent acoustics and was popular with the public.

The building was gutted in an air raid on the night of 25 April 1944. Beginning in 1951, it was rebuilt by Josef Wiedemann to house the Ministry of the Interior. Recreation of the façade took until 1954. The former auditorium became an interior courtyard. Numerous lovers of music and architecture asked for it to be restored as a concert space, but this was not technically or financially feasible. The preservationist and architect Erwin Schleich campaigned for it to be recreated on the site of the Palais Leuchtenberg, also destroyed in the war, but despite widespread support organised by the Arbeitskreis Odeon (Odeon Working Group) formed by Schleich in 1960, that plan was also rejected. It pitted preservationists who argued that such a recreation would be a "forgery" against those like Schleich who valued "social utility" over authenticity.

In 2003–06, the courtyard was covered with a glazed roof (a gridshell) by the architecture firm of Ackermann and Partner.
