= Maria Elektrine von Freyberg =

German painter

Electrina von Freyberg
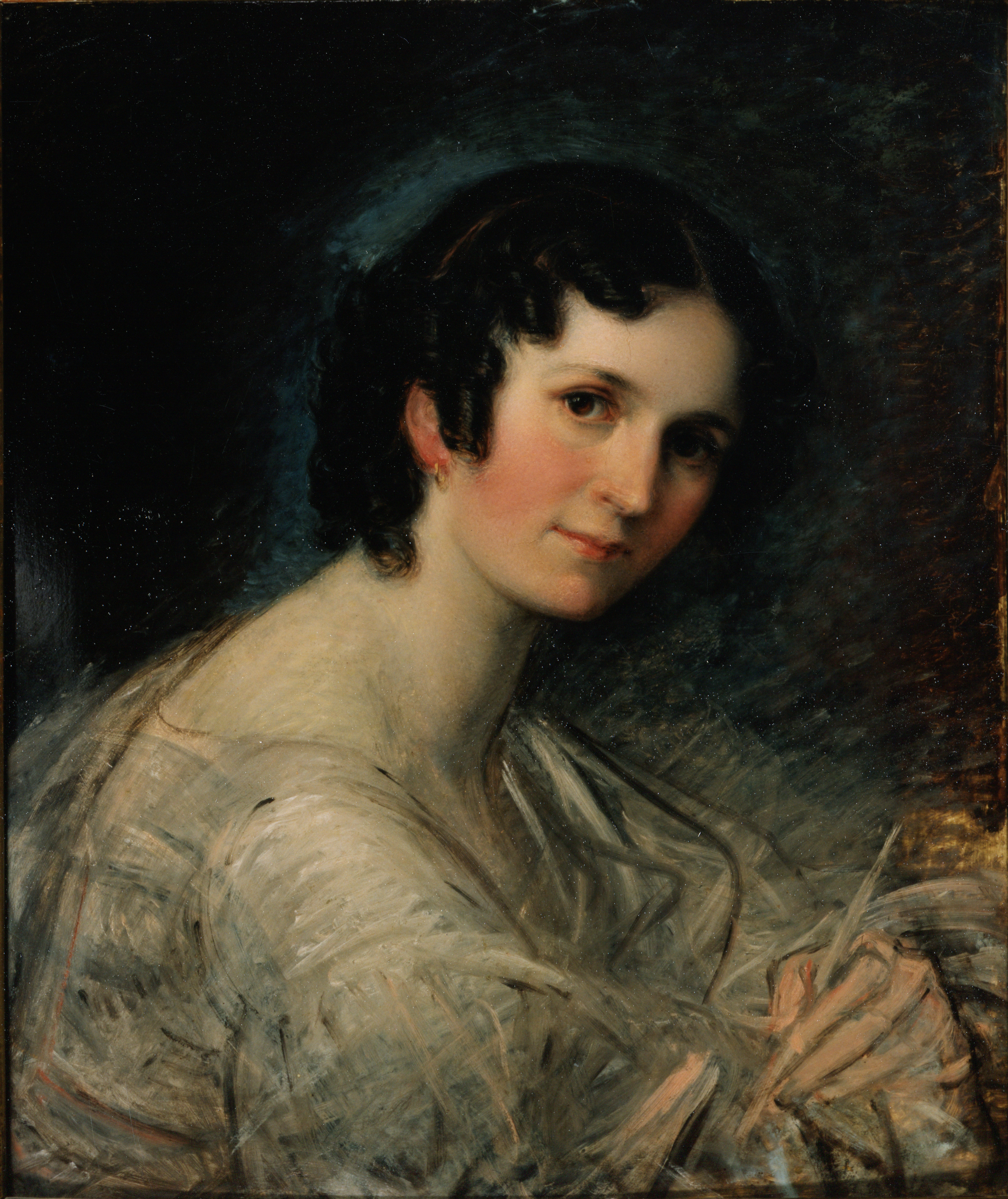
- Electrina von Freyberg in a self-portrait, around 1836
- Born: 14 March 1797; Strasbourg, France
- Died: 1 January 1847 (aged 49); Munich, Germany
- Known for: Painting
- Spouse: Wilhelm Freiherr von Freyberg (m. 1823)

Maria Elektrine Freifrau von Freyberg (14 March 1797, in Strasbourg, France – 1 January 1847, in Munich, Kingdom of Bavaria) was the daughter and pupil of Johann Baptist Stuntz, a painter of landscapes, under whose tuition she gave proof of great ability. She visited France and Italy, and stayed at Rome some time. Her paintings of historical scenes are distinguished for a tender touch, and she was not less successful in portraiture and landscape painting. One of her best works is a Holy Family. The Birth of St. John, and two landscapes, in the album of King Louis of Bavaria, are by this artist; in the Leuchtenberg Gallery The Virgin and Child, and The Three Maries at the Tomb; and in the Munich Gallery a Holy Family, The Naming of St. John the Baptist, and A Boy playing the flute. She died at Munich in 1847.

== See also ==
- List of German painters
