= Joseph Flüggen =

German painter

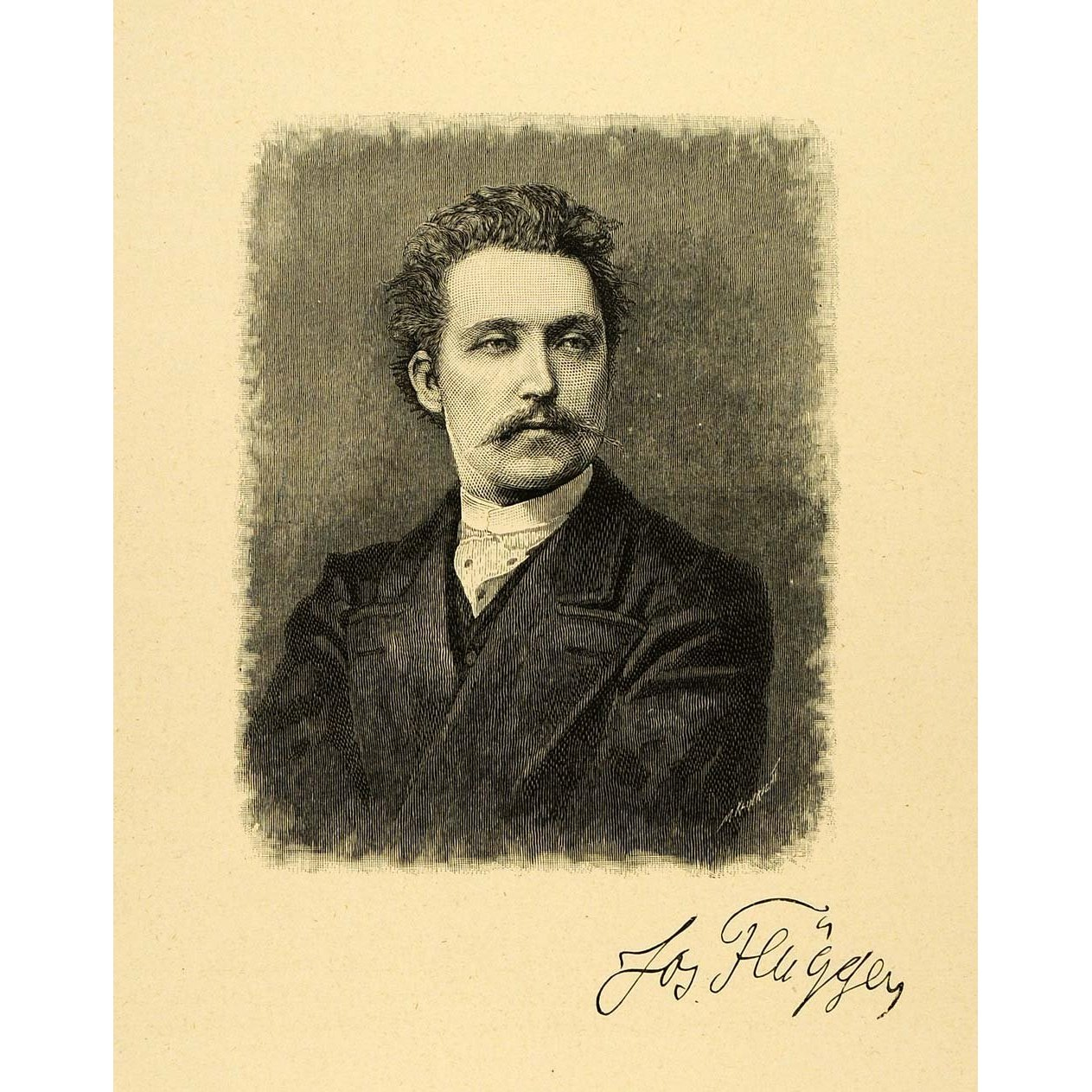
- Born: 3 April 1842; Munich
- Died: 3 November 1906 (aged 64); Munich
- Education: Munich Academy
- Known for: art, Painting
- Movement: Historical Painting

Joseph Eduard Flüggen (1842-1906) was a German artist born in Munich in 1842. The son of Gisbert Flüggen from Munich, Joseph first studied under his father and then studied his craft at the Munich Academy.

== Biography ==
Flüggen enrolled at the Munich Academy in 1856. By 1859 he became a student of Karl Theodor von Piloty, under whose influence he began to paint historical paintings. In 1866 Flüggen brought his studies to an end and traveled to Paris, London, Brussels and Antwerp. It was in Antwerp that he painted under the direction of Hendrik Leys.

At the end of the 1870s there emerged a series of works on the subject of Wagnerian opera, which brought him to the attention of Ludwig II of Bavaria, who appointed him court theater painter.

Flüggen died in 1906. Although not as prolific as many of his contemporaries, his works have a track record of successful auction transactions with prices recorded up to $20,000. Auction houses that have featured his work include: Bonhams, Dorotheum, and Neumeister among others.

== See also ==
- List of German painters
