= Johann Baptist Stuntz =

Johann Baptist Stuntz (1753, in Arlesheim – 1836, in Munich) was a Swiss-German landscape painter and lithographer.

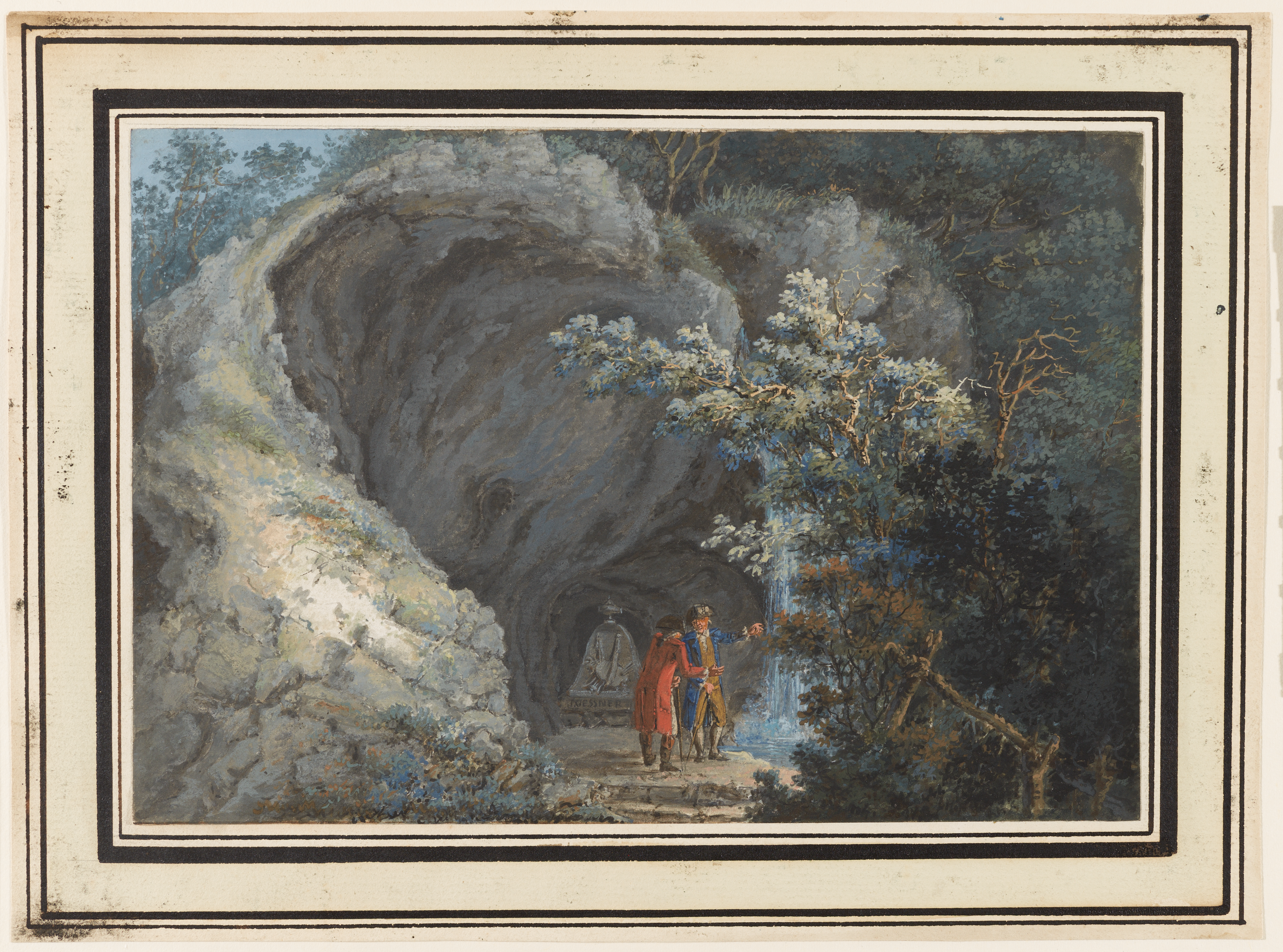
Arlesheim, Grotte der Ermitage by Stuntz

He lived as an artist in Biel, during which time, he painted landscapes in gouache – his paintings of St. Peter's Island in Lake Biel were highly thought of. He later worked as an art dealer in Strasbourg, and from 1808 operated a lithography business in Munich. He also worked as a gilder and sculptor in wood and marble for a church in Boécourt.

He was the father of composer Joseph Hartmann Stuntz (1793–1859) and painter Maria Elektrine von Freyberg (1797–1847).
