= Pietro degli Ingannati =

Italian painter

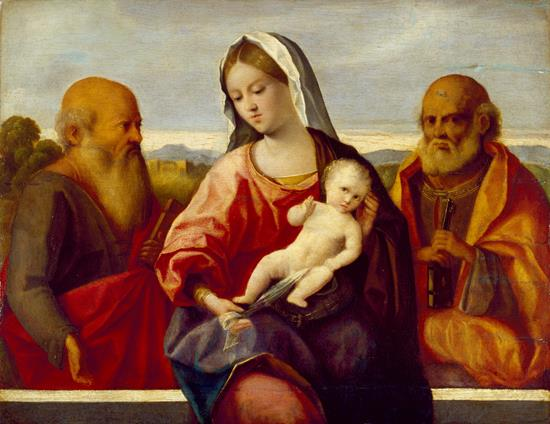
Madonna and Child with Saints Peter and Paul

Pietro degli Ingannati, also Pellegrino di Giovanni di Antonio, (active 1529–1548) was an Italian Renaissance painter who is known for his paintings of the Virgin and Child and his portraits.

== Life and work ==
Ingannati's exact dates of birth and death are not known. Ingannati was probably born in Veneto. The importance of the artist has only relatively recently been recognized as his work used to be confused with that Francesco Bissolo, an artist who also worked in a style reminiscent of Giovanni Bellini. He trained in the studio of Alvise Vivarini.

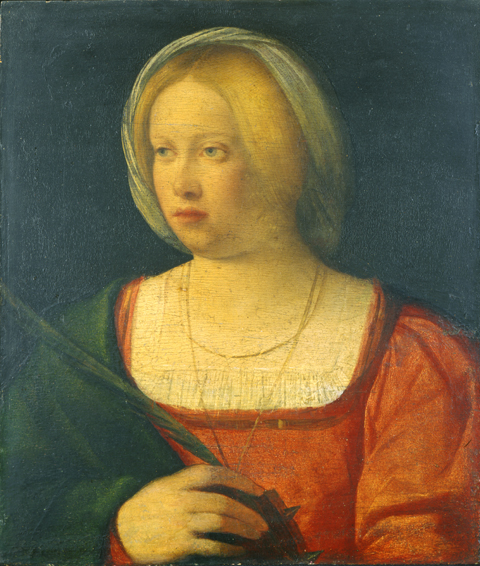
Young woman dressed as St Catherine

His early works show the influence of Giovanni Bellini, especially in the composition, although his art is closer to artists like Lazzaro Bastiani, Marco Basaiti or Benedetto Rusconi. Later, his style became closer to that of Bellini, approaching the way of painting of Vincenzo Catena and showing the superficial influence of innovations introduced by Giorgione.

Ingannati returned often to the theme of the Sacra Conversazione, which is a depiction of the Virgin and Child (the Virgin Mary with the infant Jesus) surrounded by a group of saints. This motif was typical of Venetian painting and had been popularized by Titian. Ingannati's many representations of this theme included repetitive patterns, especially in the figures.

Artists like Ingannati and Rocco Marconi remained attached to an archaic style that copied the essence but not the innovations of the most advanced Venetian masters such as Francesco Vecellio or Palma Vecchio, without losing the taste for the classic color of the Venetian school.
