= Hendrik van Limborch =

Dutch painter

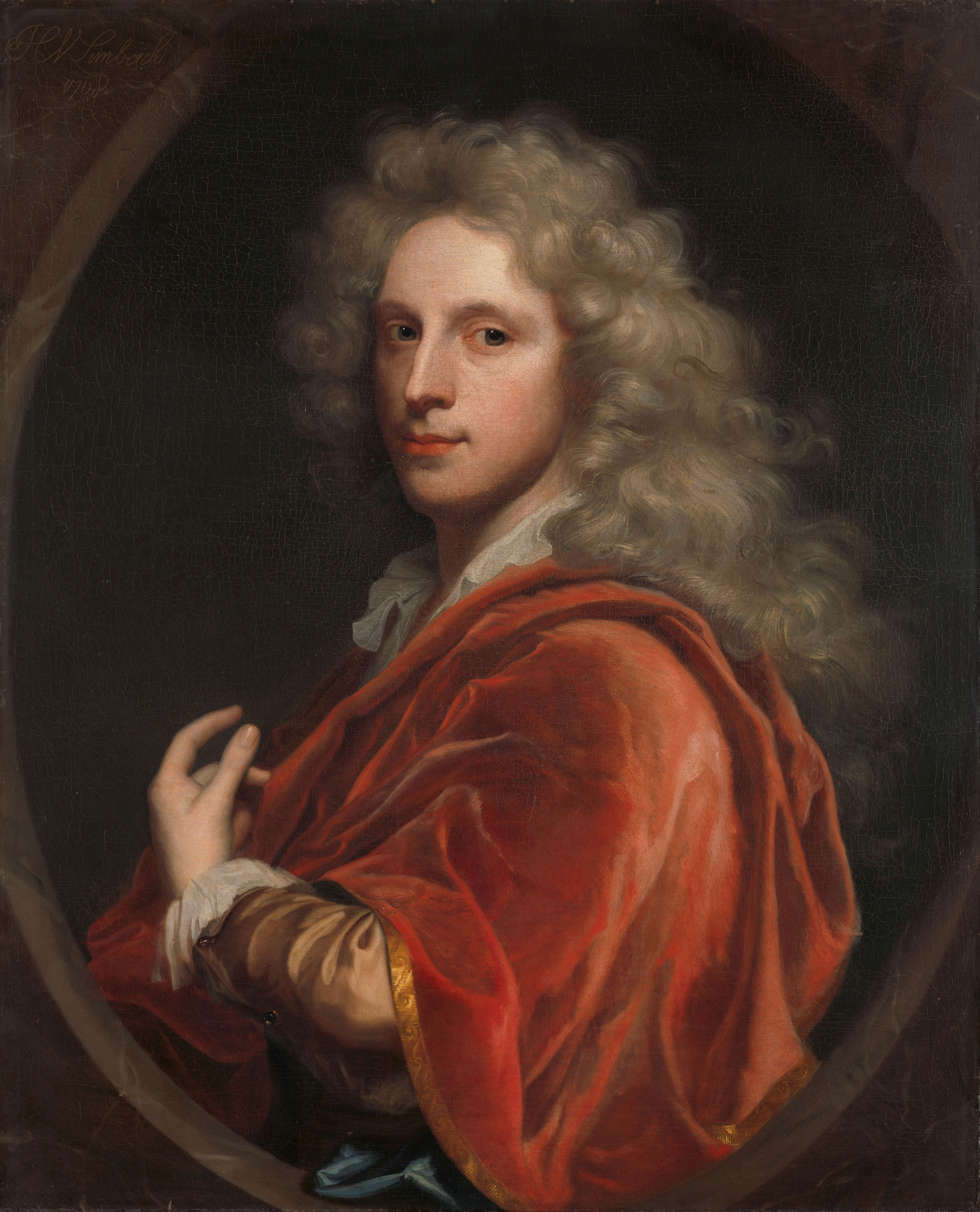
- Self-portrait, 1708
- Born: 9 March 1681; The Hague
- Died: 3 February 1759 (aged 77); The Hague

Hendrik van Limborch (9 March 1681 – 3 February 1759) was a painter and an engraver from the Dutch Republic.

Limborch was born in The Hague. He was the son of a lawyer and became the pupil of Jan Hendrik Brandon, Robbert Duval, Jan de Baen and Adriaen van der Werff.

Limborch was known for portraits and historical allegories and died in The Hague.

== Gallery ==
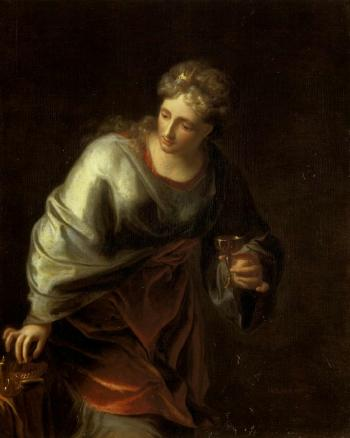
Artemisia II Queen of Caria

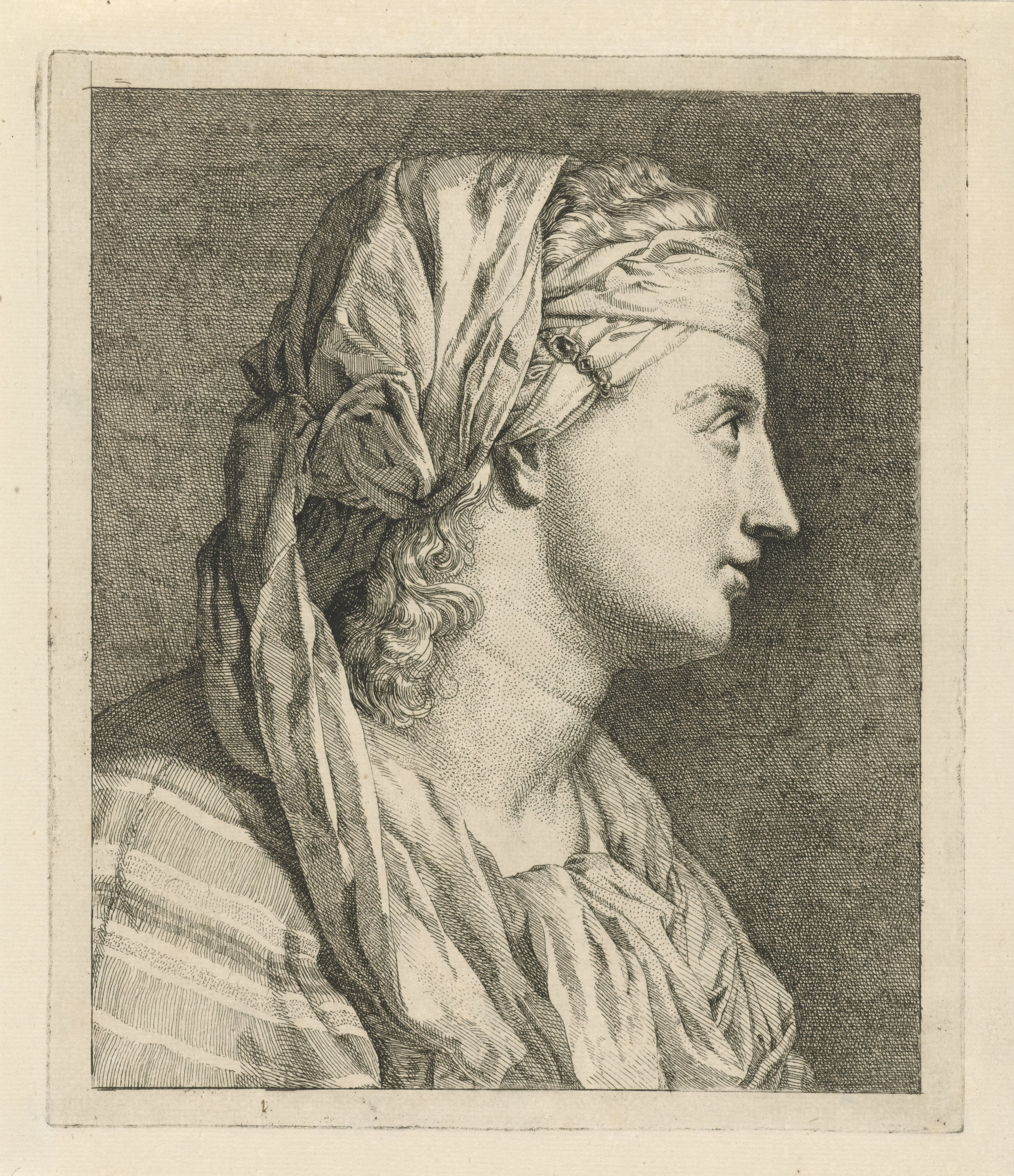
Portrait of an unknown woman

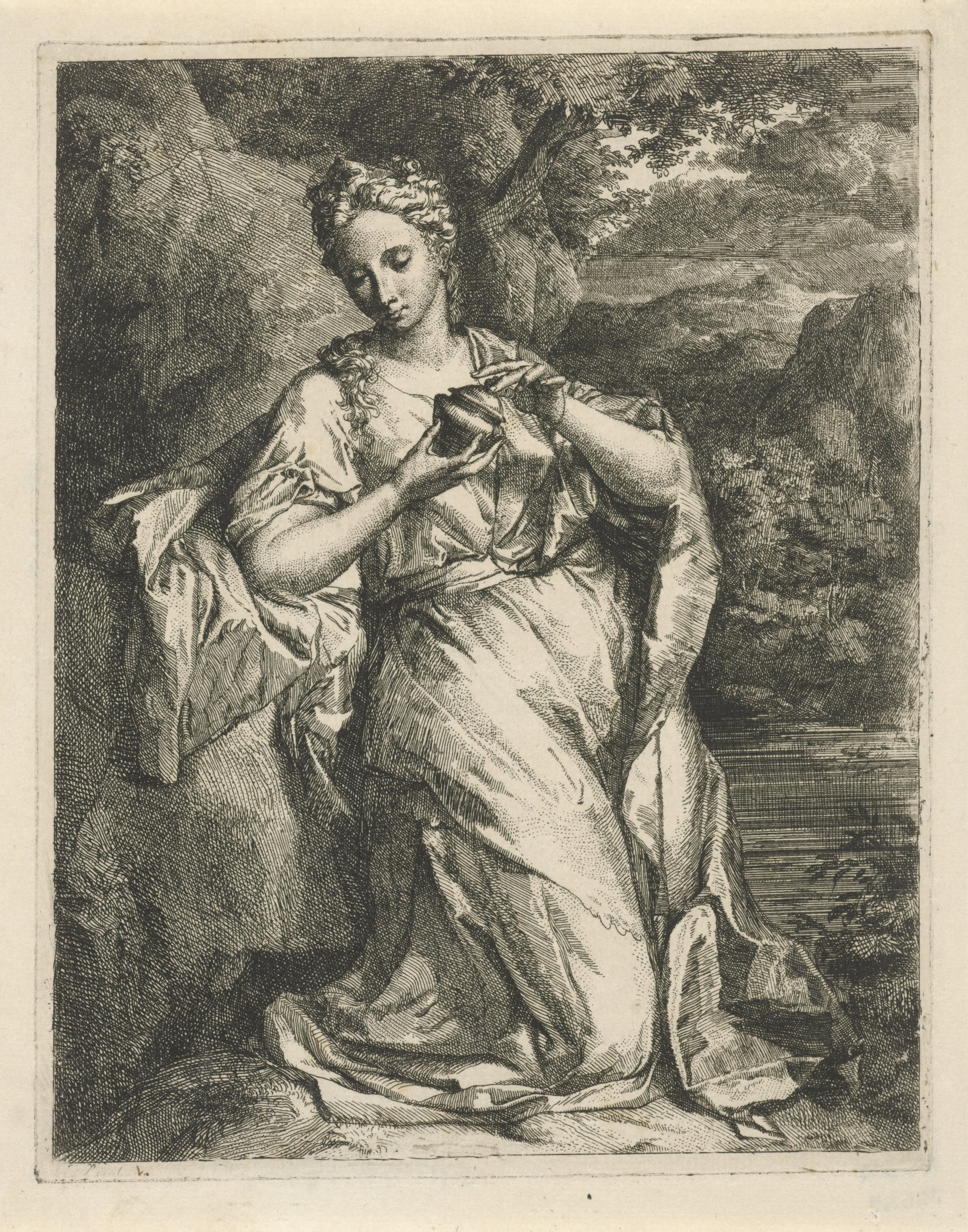
Woman with perfume vase
