= Johan le Ducq =

Dutch painter

- Born: 1629; The Hague
- Died: 1676 (aged 46–47); The Hague

Johan le Ducq (1629 in The Hague – 1676 in The Hague) was a Dutch painter.

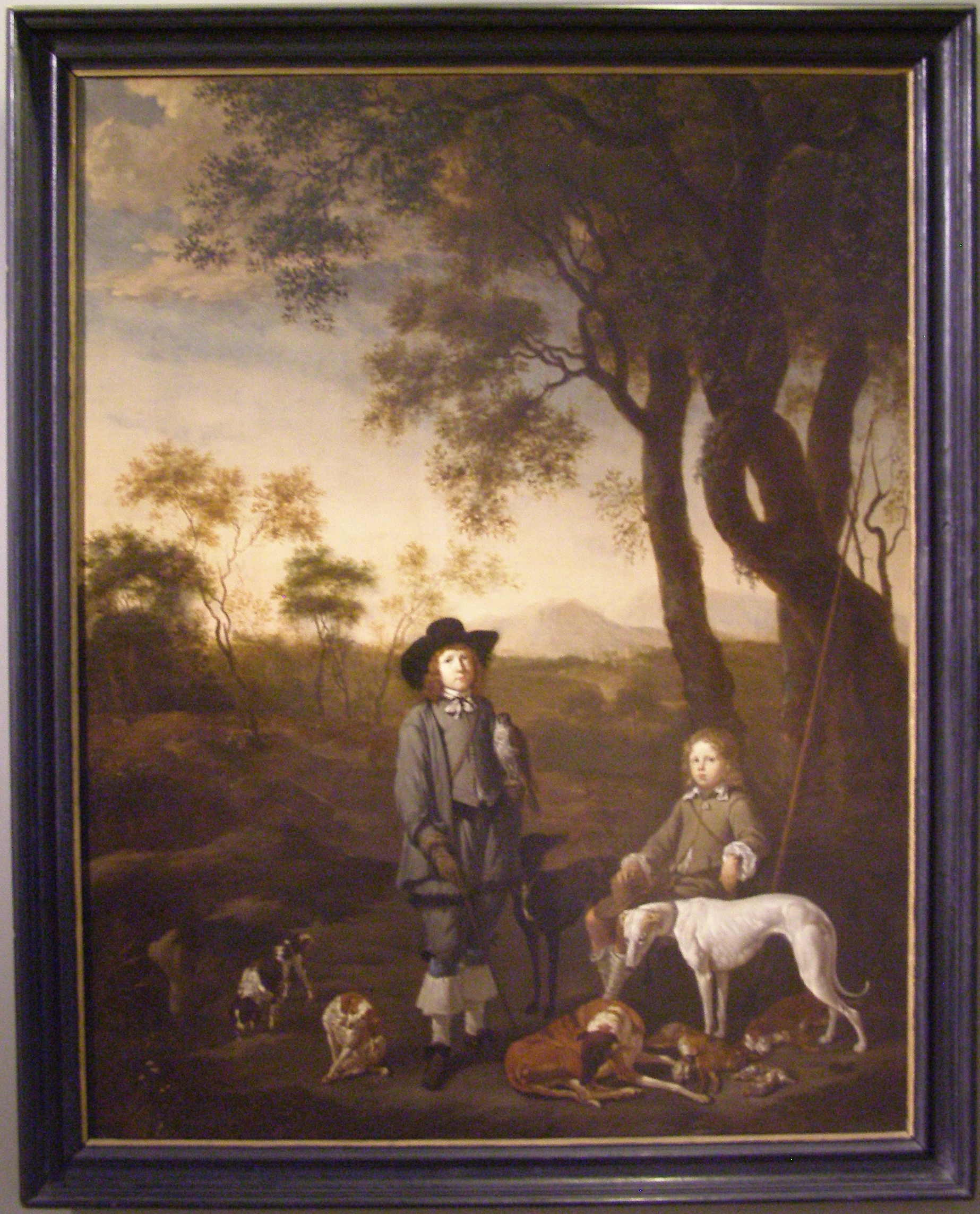
Princes de Vildt on a Hunt (1656)

It is generally thought that he studied under Paulus Potter and possibly with Karel du Jardin. In 1660 he was admitted to the Society of Painters in The Hague, where in 1671 he became director of the Academy. In 1671 he also joined the army of the Staten-Generaal as an ensign. He died in 1676 from wounds received from a fight with a fellow soldier over money.

He is remembered as a painter of landscapes and animals; his works featuring dogs are especially prized.
