= Joseph Charles Cogels =

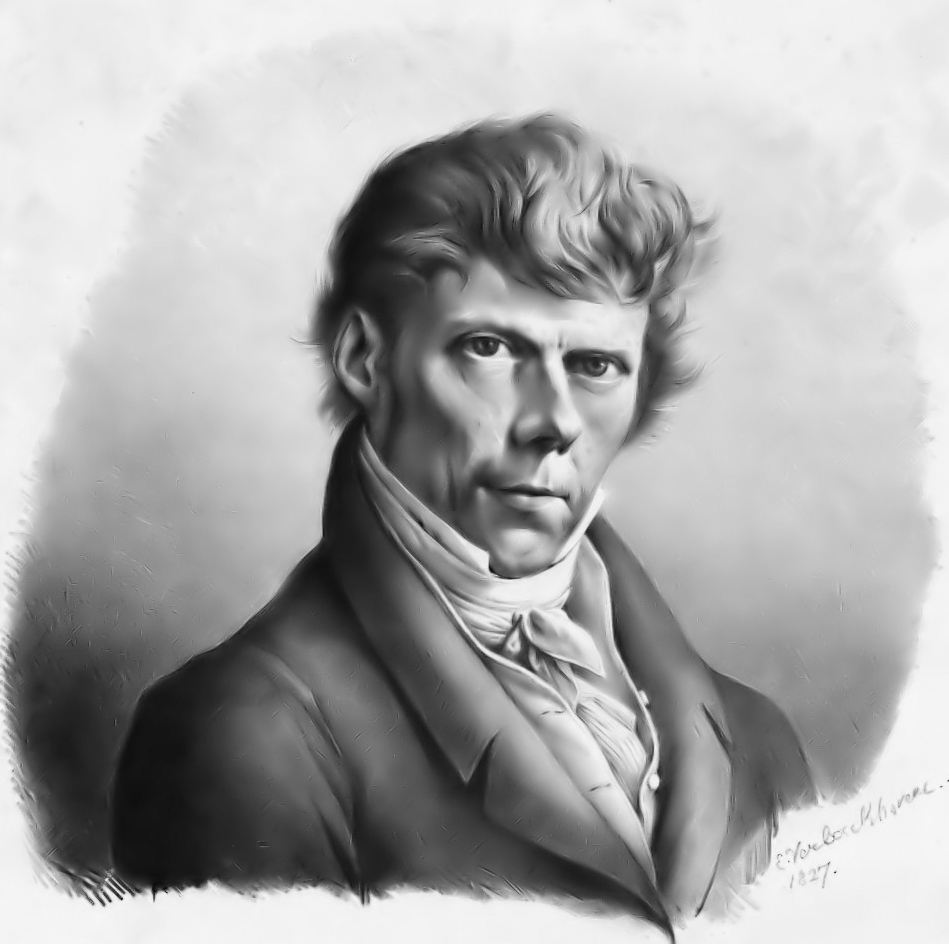
Joseph Carl Cogel, after Eugène Joseph Verboeckhoeven

Joseph Charles Cogels, (sometimes called Cogels Mabilde,) a landscape and marine painter, was born at Brussels in 1786. He studied at the Academy of Düsseldorf; and, after spending some time in France, returned to the area that is now Belgium in 1806, and was admitted a member of the Royal Society of the Fine Arts at Ghent. In 1810 he went to Munich, where he was employed by the King and Queen and the Duke of Leuchtenberg in painting cabinet pictures for their private collections, and for the Gallery at Schleissheim. His paintings, which are principally landscapes, water-falls, and old monuments cf his native country, are held in high estimation. In the Cassel Gallery is a view of the St. Salvator Platz, Munich (1819),

He etched also several plates, partly after J. Both, partly from his own designs. In 1817 he was made a member of the Academy at Antwerp. He, however, established himself at Munich, and was an honorary member of the Academy there. He died in 1831, at the Castle of Leitheim near Donauwörth.
