= Johann Jakob Dorner the Elder =

German painter

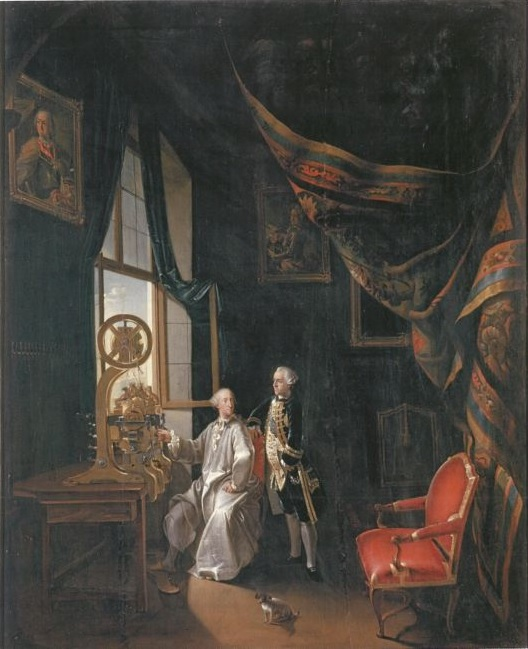
Maximilian III Joseph, Elector of Bavaria and Joseph Ferdinand Maria von Salern, 1765

Johann Jakob Dorner the Elder (1741–1813), who was born at Ehrenstetten, near Freiburg in Breisgau, was a painter of historical and genre subjects. He was at first a pupil of Rösch at Freiburg and of Ignaz Bauer at Augsburg. He afterwards visited Italy, the Netherlands, and Paris. He was a professor and director of the Gallery at Munich in 1770, and died in that city in 1813. In the Darmstadt Gallery is a picture of Two Soldiers and a Maiden by him; and in the Pinakothek at Munich, a Linen Draper, which is a portrait of his wife, dated 1775.

The amateur Amalia von Schattenhofer was a pupil of Dorner. His son also became a painter.

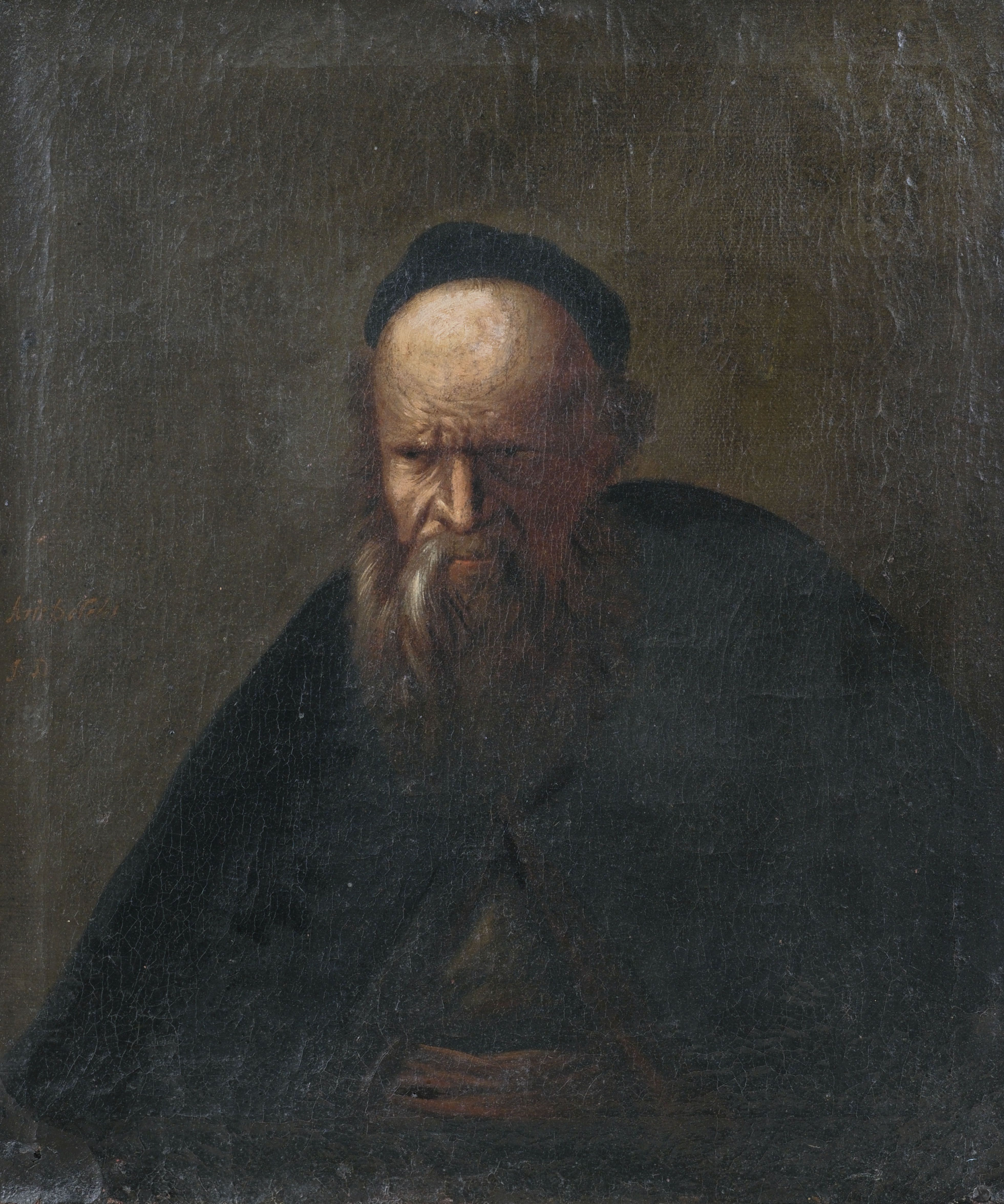
Aristoteles

== See also ==
- List of German painters
