= Johann Jakob Dorner the Younger =

German painter (1775–1852)

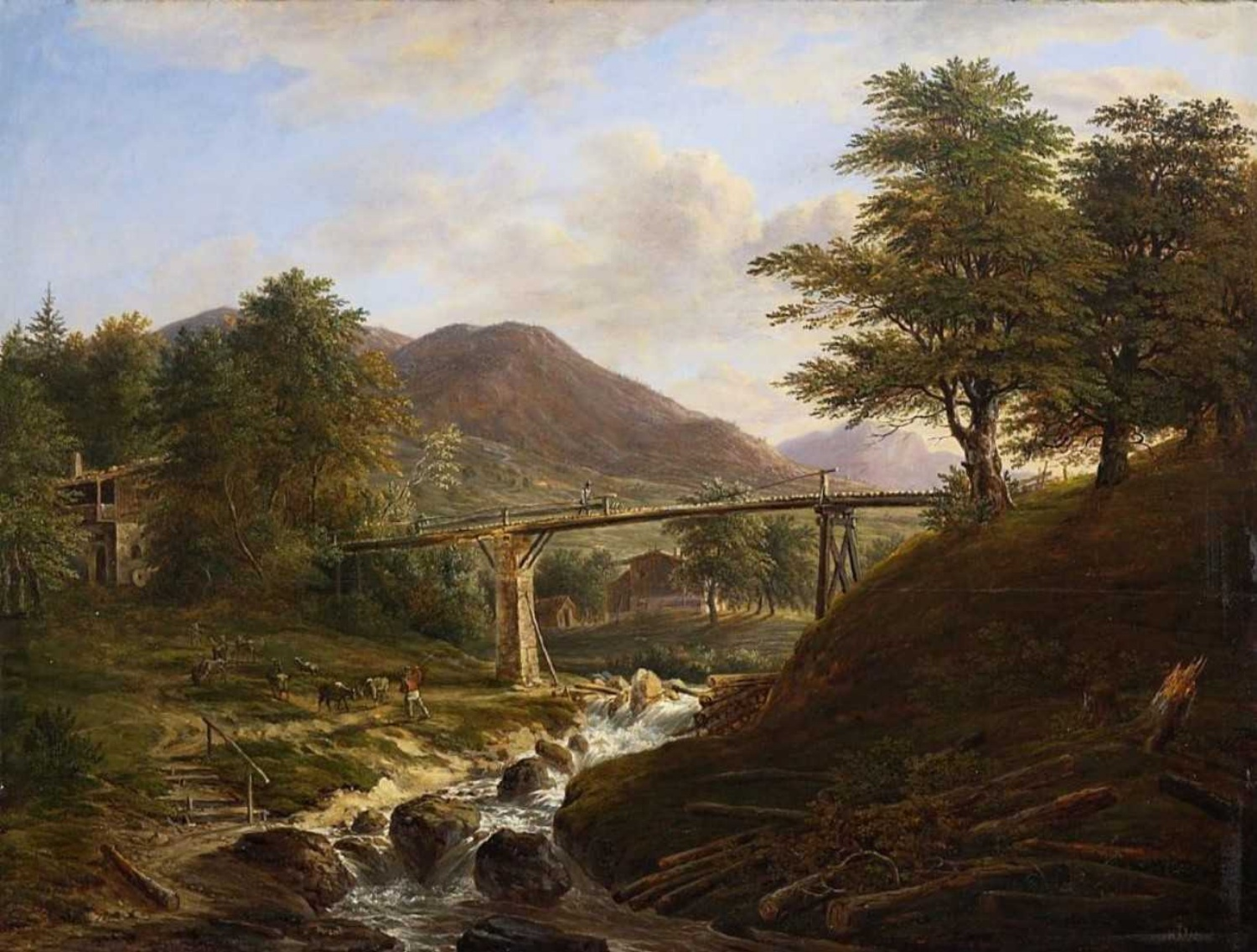
Area in Albach near Tegernsee in Altbaiern, 1818

Johann Jakob Dorner the Younger (1775–1852) was a Bavarian landscape painter. The son of Johann Jakob Dorner the Elder, he was born in Munich and was instructed in art by his father and by Mannlich. Afterwards he studied the works of Claude Lorrain and Karel Du Jardin. He travelled by himself through the picturesque regions of Bavaria, Switzerland, and France. His works are distinguished for spirited composition and taste in their execution. In 1803 he became Restorer, and in 1808 Inspector of the Royal Gallery at Munich, and was subsequently elected a member of the Academies of Hanau, Vienna, Berlin, and Munich. He died in Munich.

The following works by him are in public collections:

- Berlin. Gallery. A Forest Road. 1817.
- Cassel. Gallery. Two Waterfalls.
- Munich. Pinakothek. View of the Walchensee, in the Mountains of Upper Bavaria, Waterfall, with a Huntsman, Landscape and Mill near Pasing, and Landscape in the Tyrol during a Thunderstorm.
