= Palais Preysing =

Building in Germany

Coordinates: 48°08′30″N 11°34′38″E

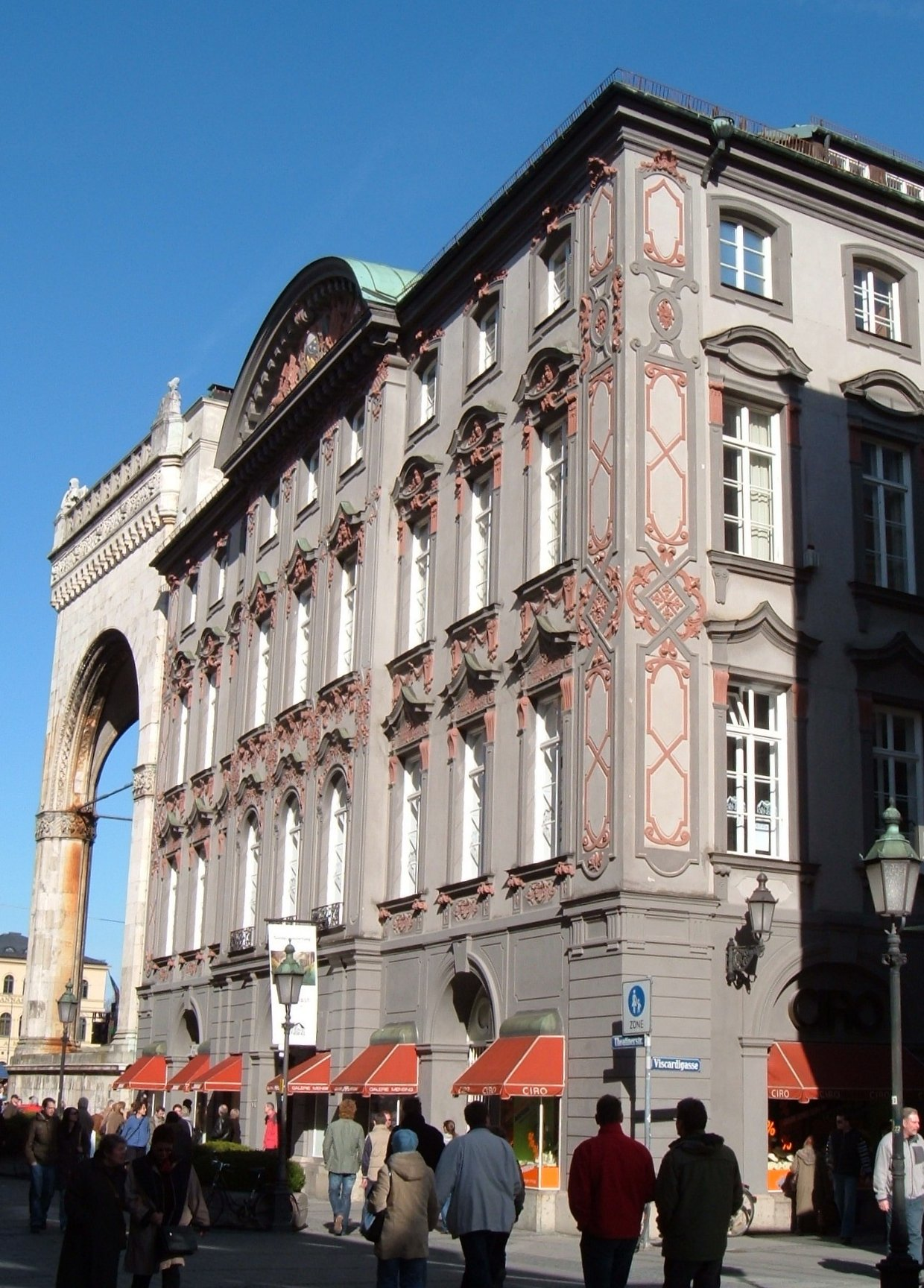
Palais Preysing

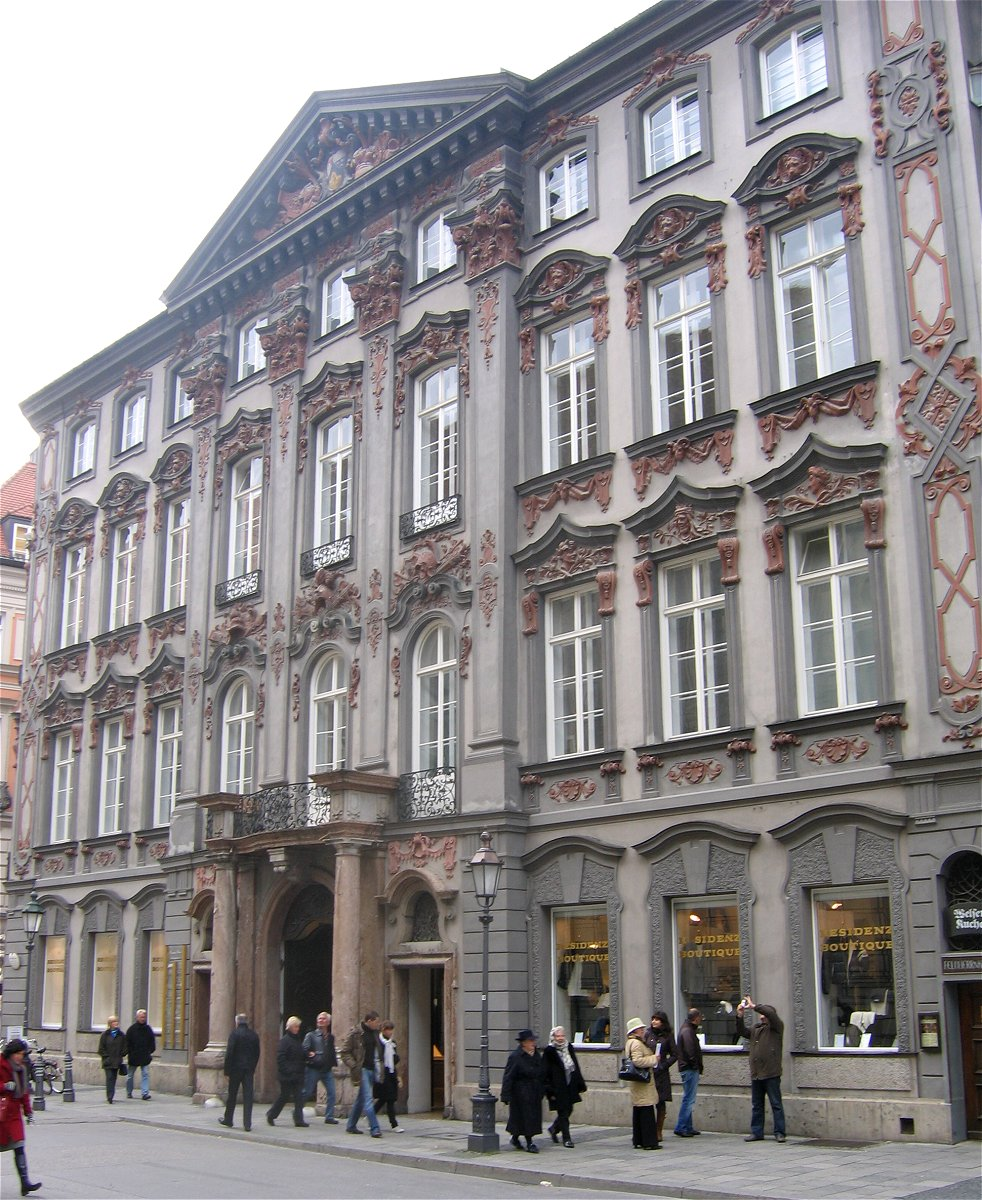
Palais Preysing

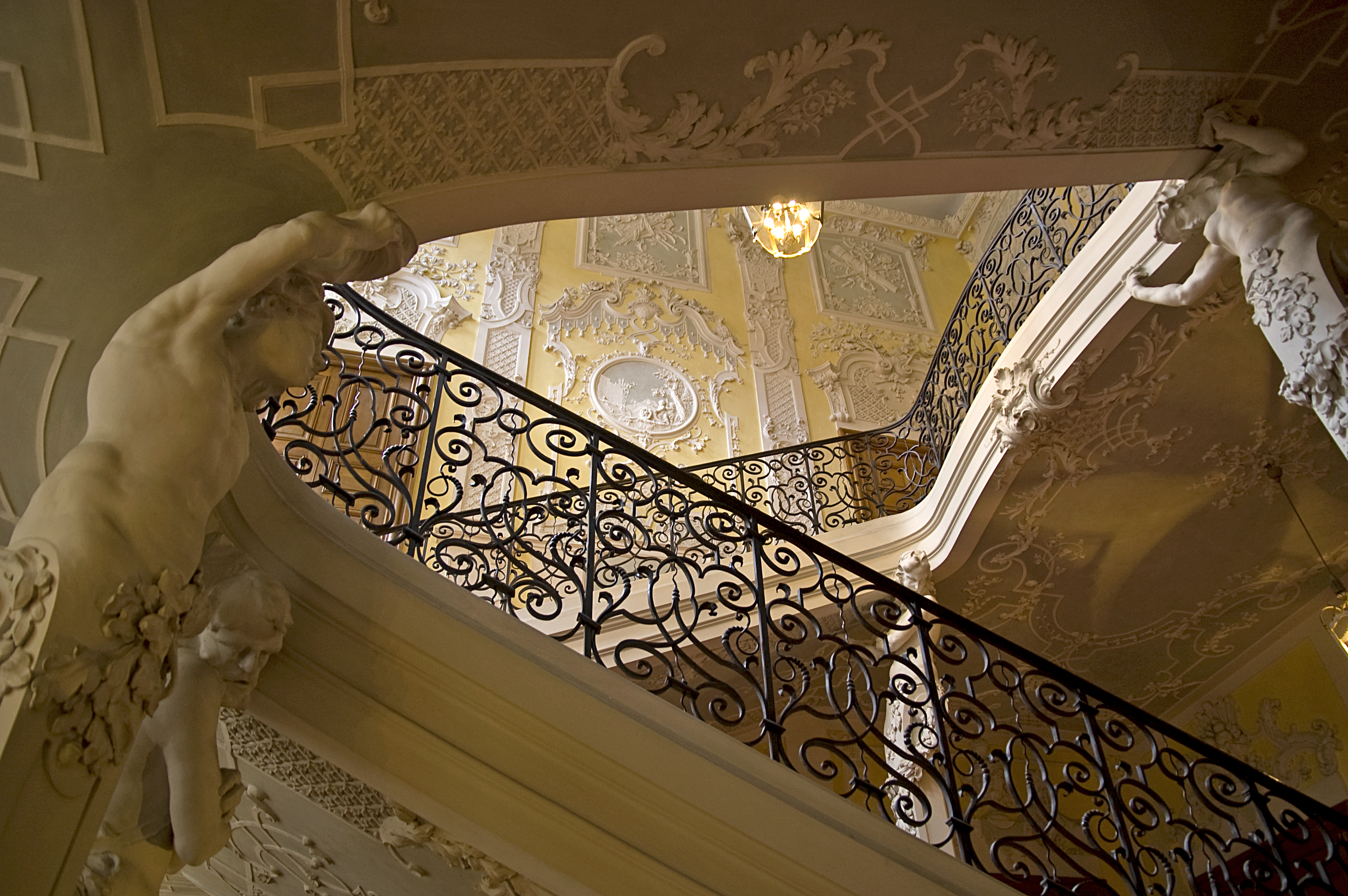
Palais Preysing - Staircase

The Palais Preysing is a Rococo style building at Residenzstraße 27, opposite the Residenz in Munich, Southern Germany, which served as residence for the Counts of Preysing. To distinguish it from the nearby Palais Neuhaus-Preysing, it is also called the Elder Palais Preysing.

Joseph Effner built the mansion between 1723 and 1728 for the Count Johann Maximilian of Preysing-Hohenaschau (1687-1764). Opposite to the Residenz, it is Munich's first Rococo style palace. The exterior walls are embellished with stucco.

In 1723, Joseph Effner received a commission from Count Johann Maximilian of Preysing-Hohenaschau(1687-1764) to build a four-story city palace with a facade that has a width for nine window frames. In addition to richly furnished living quarters, a chapel and a ballroom, the palace also included an impressive staircase.

On October 15, 1835, the Bayerische Hypotheken- und Wechsel-Bank started operations in the Preysing-Palais, with 11 employees.

The Palais Preysing was destroyed in World War II and then reconstructed in the 1950s with the ground floor redesigned for shops. The decorated staircase is publicly accessible.

== Viscardigasse ==
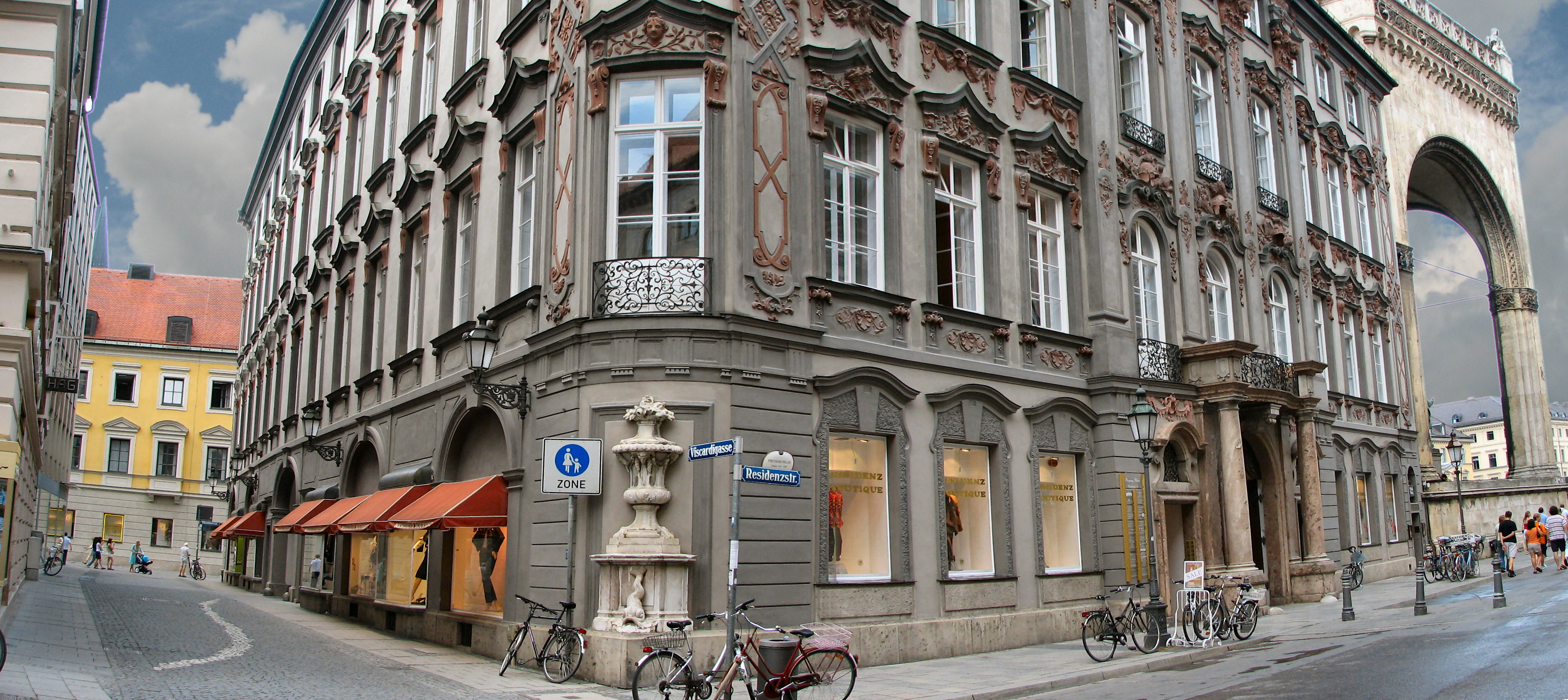
Viscardigasse with Palais Preysing and Feldherrnhalle

The mansion is situated behind the Feldherrnhalle at Odeonsplatz, the little alley behind the Palais Preysing connecting the Residenzstrasse and the Theatinerstraße is called Viscardigasse (after Giovanni Antonio Viscardi), but it used to be known by the locals as "Drueckebergergasse". "Drueckeberger" is a German slang expression for someone who tries to avoid his duty. Adolf Hitler ordered that everyone passing the Feldherrnhalle had to give the Nazi salute as they walked by, as a tribute to the Nazi sympathizers who had been killed at that spot in the Beer Hall Putsch of 1923. Many people practiced a kind of passive resistance by making a detour down the Viscardigasse, to avoid passing the Feldherrnhalle and having to salute. In the mid-90s, a wavy stripe of gold-colored pavement stones were placed in the Viscardigasse in memorial of this civil resistance.
