= Theatinerstraße =

Street in Munich, Germany

Coordinates: 48°8′24″N 11°34′35″E

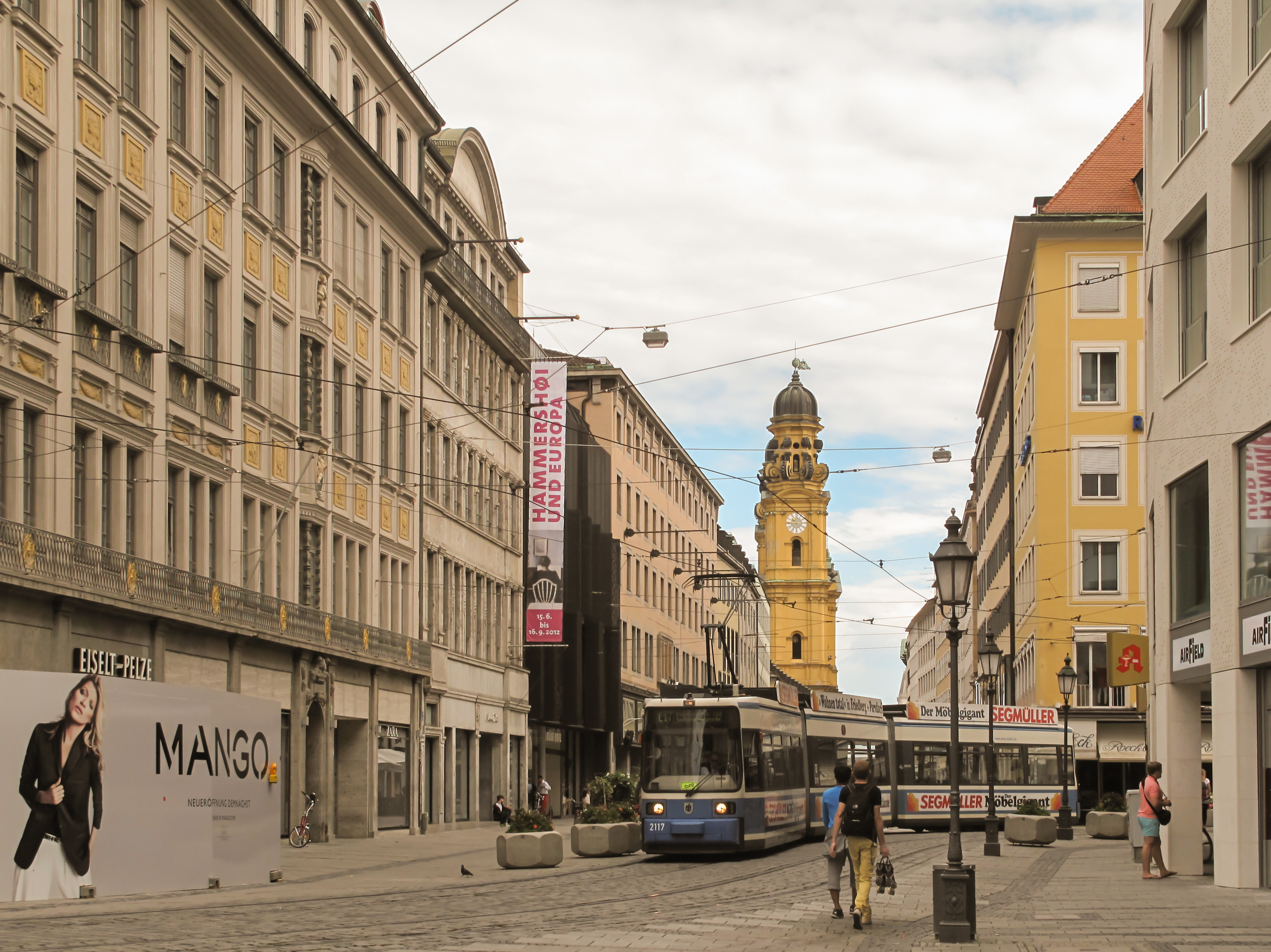
- Theatinerstraße with Theatine Church in the background

- Location within Germany
- Namesake: Theatine Church
- Length: 380 m (1,250 ft)
- Location: Munich
- Postal code: 80333
- Major junctions: Brienner Straße, Viscardigasse, Salvatorstraße, Perusastraße, Maffeistraße

Theatinerstraße is a street in Munich's old town. It connects the Odeonsplatz with the southern Marienhof and houses a number of classical buildings and several shops. The street received its name due to the adjoining Theatinerkirche; it used to be called Hintere Schwabinger Gasse.

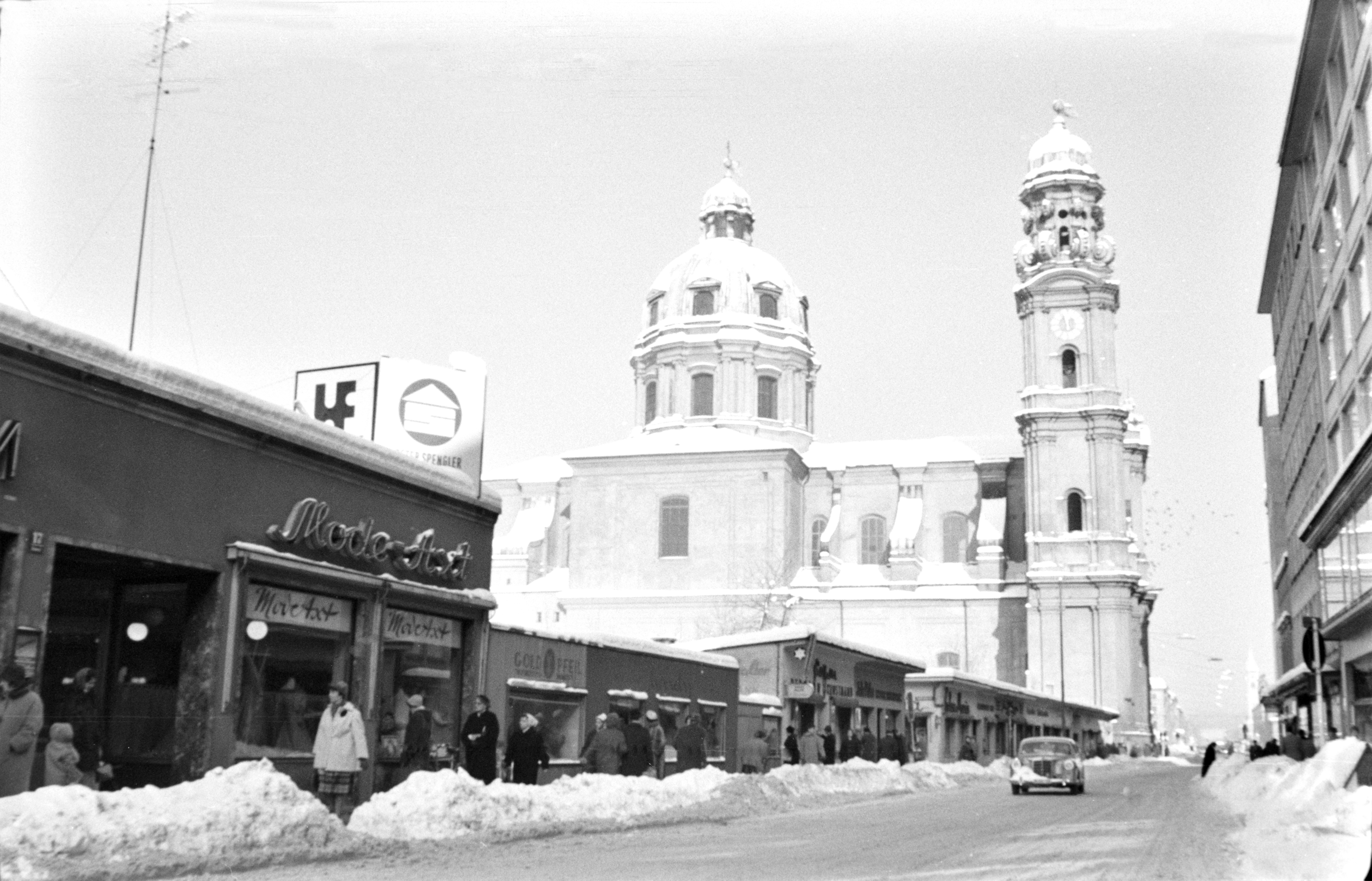
Winter 1959

== Location ==
The Theatinerstraße extends from the Odeonsplatz south to the Marienhof. The Viscardigasse and the Perusastraße connect them with the residential road in the east; via the Salvatorstraße or the Maffeistraße, the western parallel road Kardinal-Faulhaber-Straße can be reached. At the height of the Marienhof, the Theatinerstraße turns into Weinstraße at the junction Schäfflergasse, which then leads past the New Town Hall to the Marienplatz. The Theatinerstraße–Weinstraße is part of the north-south medieval trade route, which existed at the time of the city's founding in the 12th century and crossed the salt road at Marienplatz in an east-west direction. The transition from the Weinstraße to the Theatinerstraße marks the border of the medieval so-called Heinrichsstadt. There, until 1691, the Hinteres Schwabinger Tor (rear Schwabinger Tor) also called Wilbrechtsturm (Wilbrecht tower), was located. Until 1817, the outer Schwabinger Tor stood at the northern end of Theatinerstraße.

== Shopping street ==
Many international companies have branches on Theatinerstraße, including Armani, Bassetti, Butlers, Zara, Esprit and Bose. It also houses the Fünf Höfe, which houses another 60 shops, several restaurants and the Kunsthalle of the Hypo-Kulturstiftung.

== Transportation ==
The entire Theatinerstraße is declared a pedestrian zone and not is passable for motorized individual traffic.

With the Munich Underground, the Theatinerstraße can be reached from the underground station Odeonsplatz via the lines U3, U4, U5 and U6. Also at Odeonsplatz, there is a bus stop served by lines N40, N41 and 100. For the Munich tram there is the Theatinerstraße stop at the corner of Maffeistraße, which is served by the line 19.

== Attractions ==
- Palais Moy (D-1-62-000-979)
- Palais Preysing
- Arco-Palais (D-1-62-000-6844)
- Feldherrnhalle (D-1-62-000-4933)
- Theatinerkirche (D-1-62-000-6847)
