= Max Erwin von Scheubner-Richter =

Influential early member of the Nazi Party (1884–1923)

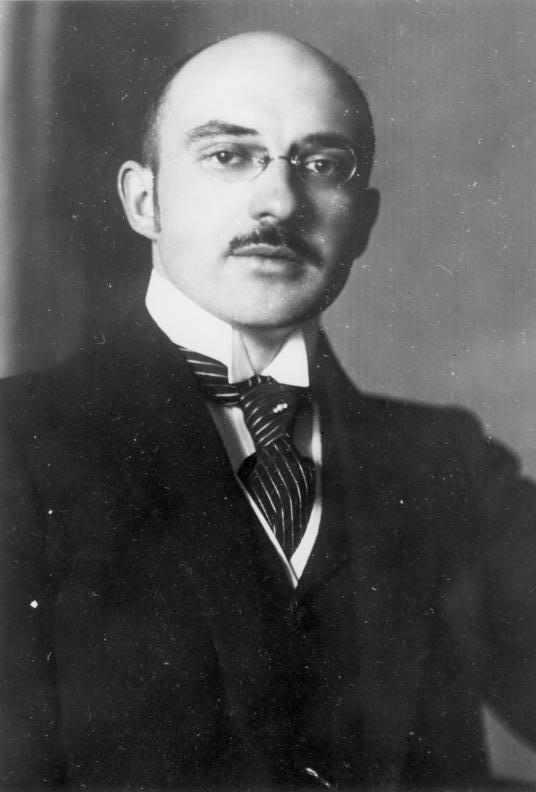
- Scheubner-Richter in 1915
- Born: Ludwig Maximilian Erwin Richter; 21 January 1884; Riga, Russian Empire
- Died: 9 November 1923 (aged 39); Munich, Weimar Republic
- Military career
- Allegiance: German Empire: Kingdom of Bavaria
- Branch: Imperial German Army: Bavarian Army
- Service years: 1914–1918
- Unit: 7th Bavarian Chevauleger-Regiment Straubing (August–November 1914)
- Conflicts: Russian Revolution of 1905; World War I Beer Hall Putsch †

Ludwig Maximilian Erwin von Scheubner-Richter (Latvian: Ludvigs Rihters) (21 January [O.S. 9 January] 1884 – 9 November 1923) was a Baltic German chemist, officer, political activist and an influential early member of the Nazi Party.

Scheubner-Richter was a Baltic German from Russia and fought against the Russian Revolution of 1905 before serving in the Imperial German Army during World War I, witnessing and producing documentation of the Armenian genocide. He was the founder of the Aufbau-Vereinigung and a leading ideologist of Nazism at the beginning of the Interwar period. Scheubner-Richter became a key influence and close associate of Adolf Hitler, and an activist of the Nazi Party instrumental in securing financing for its early stages.

Scheubner-Richter was killed during the Beer Hall Putsch in November 1923 and part of Hitler's Mein Kampf was dedicated to him. He was elevated to status of Blutzeuge ("blood witness") and national hero upon the founding of Nazi Germany in 1933. Of the 15 Nazis who were killed by the police during the coup, Hitler described Scheubner-Richter as the only one who was "irreplaceable".

== Early life ==
Ludwig Maximilian Erwin Richter was born on 21 January 1884 in Riga, Russian Empire, the son of a German musician and a Baltic German mother. Richter lived a large part of his early life in the Governorate of Livonia, and studied chemistry at the Riga Polytechnical Institute from 1904 to 1906. Richter joined a pro-government private army during the Russian Revolution of 1905 and married Mathilde von Scheubner, the daughter of the owner of a factory he was tasked with protecting. Mathilde was 19 years his senior and a noblewoman. After the conclusion of the revolution in 1907, Richter moved to the German city of Munich, Bavaria, where he continued his studies and became a Doktoringenieur. In 1912, Scheubner was prefixed to his own name upon adoption by one of his wife's relatives, an old German form of having one's lineage ennobled.

== World War I and Armenian genocide ==
On 10 August 1914, shortly after the outbreak of World War I, Scheubner-Richter joined the Bavarian Army as a volunteer and was assigned to the 7th Chevauleger Regiment on the Western Front. However, Scheubner-Richter was relocated to the Eastern Front from November 1914, where Germany was fighting the Imperial Russian Army, after one of his superiors discovered his knowledge of the Russian language.

In December 1914 Scheubner-Richter became the German vice consul of Erzurum, Turkey, succeeding Dr. Paul Schwarz – this appointment was a disguise for a secret operation by the Germans to sabotage the Russian oil fields in the Caucasus, under the belief it would cause the Russian war effort to grind to a halt. The Germans hoped to infiltrate during an Ottoman offensive on Russian fortifications in Kars, but the operation was cancelled when the Ottomans were not as successful as expected. Russian resistance made infiltration of the Caucasus impossible, and Scheubner-Richter remained working as a consul in Turkey for the remainder of the war. While holding that post, Scheubner-Richter also documented the Turkish massacres of Armenians as part of the Armenian genocide. At the time, he was considered one of the most outspoken individuals against the deportations and subsequent massacres of Armenians. Scheubner-Richter believed that the deportations were based on "racial hatred" and that none could survive such a journey. Scheubner-Richter concluded that the deportations were a policy of "annihilation". At various times he demanded the German government intervene on behalf of the Armenians which lead to a meeting between Talaat Pasha and Johannes Heinrich Mordtmann. In the meeting, Talaat Pasha claimed that the deportations of the Armenians were for their own safety. Nevertheless, on 15 June 1915, Talaat ordered the protection of the deported Armenians in Elazığ, Bitlis and Diyarbakır, explaining this order by the fact that a convoy of Armenian deportees coming from Erzurum had been assaulted. This did not stop the deportations in Erzurum, though, and by August 1915, Scheubner-Richter acknowledged that there were no Armenians present in the district of his consulate. In October, he was succeeded by Friedrich-Werner Graf von der Schulenburg. Von Scheubner-Richter did manage to save individual Armenians, but his interventions in Constantinople and Berlin were ineffective. As the marginal notes to his letter in the Embassy of Constantinople show, his behaviour towards the Armenians was even regarded as unworldly and not appropriate to the political situation.

He subsequently headed the Riga outpost of the press section of the Imperial German Army's Ober Ost command, reporting to Captain Friedrich Bertkau, General Erich Ludendorff's press advisor.

== Nazi activity ==
In 1918, Scheubner-Richter and Alfred Rosenberg moved to Germany from Russia with the returning German Army and became members of the Wirtschaftliche Aufbau-Vereinigung (Reconstruction Organisation), a far-right conspiratorial organisation composed of White Russian émigrés and early Nazis. The Aufbau-Vereinigung sought to overthrow the governments of Weimar Germany and the Soviet Union to install authoritarian far-right regimes, and its members committed a number of terrorist acts. In March 1920 Scheubner-Richter took part in the Kapp Putsch which necessitated his fleeing to Munich, where he became a member of the Nazi Party. He had extensive contacts with potential financial contributors and soon became a leading personality in the party. The Aufbau-Vereinigung under Scheubner-Richter's leadership has been considered one of the major early influences of Adolf Hitler and the NSDAP, of which Scheubner-Richter and Rosenberg became prominent members. Scheubner-Richter met Hitler in October 1920, soon becoming his foreign policy adviser and a financier identifying other sources of income for the party.

Scheubner-Richter was particularly noteworthy for his extensive contacts with conservative and right-wing circles in Germany, including the famous World War I general Erich Ludendorff. Scheubner-Richter used his financial and political ties to court the support of the German elite, including industrialists, high ecclesiastical posts, aristocrats such as the Prussian Junkers and the Wittelsbachs, and wealthy Russian émigrés. Scheubner-Richter appealed to exiled Russian monarchists across Europe, who hoped, through support from the NSDAP, to influence German policy in the direction of eliminating the Soviet Union and re-establishing the Tsar in Russia. These efforts generated considerable financial resources for the NSDAP.

At the end of September 1923, Scheubner-Richter provided Adolf Hitler with a lengthy plan for revolution, writing: "The national revolution must not precede the seizure of political power; the seizure of the state's police power constitutes the promise for the national revolution" and "to lay hands on the state police power in a way that is at least outwardly legal".

== Death ==
Scheubner-Richter was a participant in the Beer Hall Putsch, marching on the Feldherrnhalle in Munich along with two thousand NSDAP members. On 9 November 1923, Scheubner-Richter, walking arm-in-arm with Hitler, was shot in the lungs and died instantly as he and others marched toward armed guards during the Putsch. Hitler was brought down and his right shoulder was dislocated as Scheubner-Richter's body fell after being shot dead.

Scheubner-Richter was the only "first-tier" Nazi leader to die during the Beer Hall Putsch, and of all the early party members who died in the Putsch, Hitler claimed Scheubner-Richter to be the only "irreplaceable loss". The first part of Hitler's book, Mein Kampf, is dedicated to Scheubner-Richter and the other fifteen men who died in the Putsch. The Aufbau-Vereinigung declined rapidly after Scheubner-Richter's death, and its increasing integration with the NSDAP saw most of its Russian membership abandon the organization over the growing notions of anti-Slavism and Lebensraum.

In 1933, the establishment of Nazi Germany led to Scheubner-Richter being venerated as a national hero. Scheubner-Richter was one of the most prominent Blutzeuge, a term for Nazis killed before the NSDAP's rise to power who were considered martyrs of the Nazi movement. Scheubner-Richter's name was featured on a panel attached to the Feldherrnhalle with the names of the Nazis who died in the Beer Hall Putsch. The panel was guarded by an honor guard of the SS, and every passer-by was expected to perform the Hitler salute. Numerous streets in towns across Germany were renamed after Scheubner-Richter. In 1935, the Ehrentempel ("Honor Temples") were erected at Königsplatz in Munich to house the sarcophagi of Scheubner-Richter and the other Blutzeuge that died in the Beer Hall Putsch.

== See also ==
- Witnesses and testimonies of the Armenian genocide
- Dietrich Eckart
- Alter Kämpfer
