= Ehrentempel =

Destroyed Nazi memorial in Munich, Germany

Coordinates: 48°08′44″N 11°34′01″E

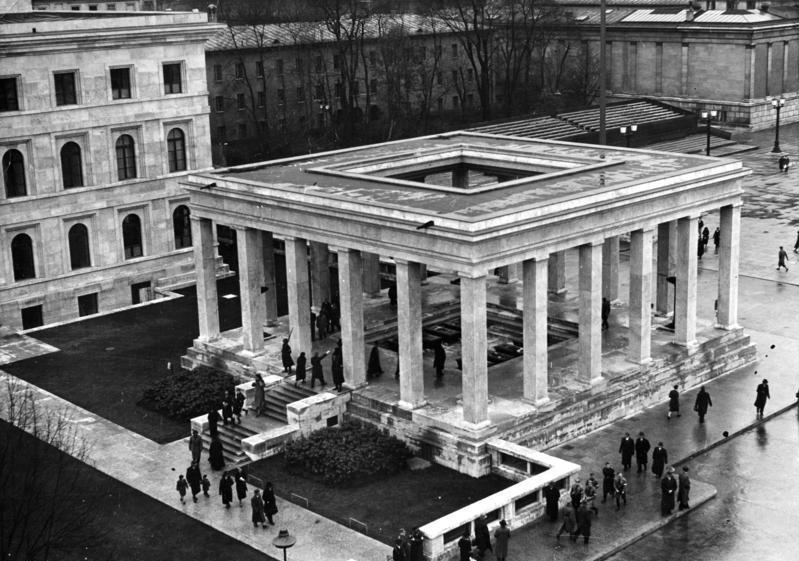
- Ehrentempel in November 1936
- Interactive map of the Ehrentempel area

General information
- Architectural style: Nazi architecture
- Location: Munich, Germany
- Completed: 1935
- Demolished: 1947
- Client: Adolf Hitler

The Honor Temples (German: Ehrentempel) were two structures in Munich, erected by the Nazis in 1935, housing the sarcophagi of the sixteen members of the Party who had been killed in the failed Beer Hall Putsch (the Blutzeugen, "blood witnesses"). On 9 January 1947, the main architectural features of the temples were destroyed by the U.S. Army as part of denazification.

== First memorial ==
On 8 November 1933, Hitler addressed the party’s old guard at the Bürgerbräukeller (where the putsch had begun) and the next day unveiled a small memorial with a plaque underneath at the east side of the Feldherrnhalle. Two policemen or the SS stood guard on either side of the memorial’s base and passers-by were required to give the Hitler salute.

The memorial could be circumvented, and the salute avoided, by choosing a small nearby side street, which came to be known as Drückebergergasse ("Shirker's Alley").

== Inauguration ==
In 1934, no commemorative march was made on the anniversary because of Hitler’s purge of the SA’s ranks in the Night of the Long Knives. The next year, on 8 November, the putschists were exhumed from their graves and taken to the Feldherrnhalle, where they were placed beneath sixteen large pylons bearing their names. The next day, after Hitler had solemnly walked past from one to the next, they were taken down the monument’s steps and taken on carts, draped in flags to Paul Ludwig Troost’s new Ehrentempel monuments at the Königsplatz, through streets lined with spectators bustling between 400 columns with eternal flames atop. Flags were lowered as veterans slowly placed the heavy sarcophagi into place. In each of the structures eight of the martyrs were interred in a sarcophagus bearing their name.

The martyrs of the movement were in heavy black sarcophagi in such a way as to be exposed to rain and sun from the open roof. When Gauleiter Adolf Wagner died from a stroke in 1944, he was interred metres away from the north temple in the adjacent grass mound in between the two temples.

== Features ==
At the temples visitors were required to be silent, not wear hats and keep children from running over the centre of the temples. The Ehrentempel was made of limestone except for its roof which was made of steel and concrete with etched glass mosaics. The pedestals of the temples, which are the only parts remaining, are 70 feet (21 m). The columns of the structures each extended 23 feet (7.0 m). The combined weight of the sarcophagi was over 2,900 pounds (1,300 kg).

== Post-war ==
On 5 July 1945, the American occupying army removed the bodies from the Ehrentempel and contacted their families. They were given the option of having their loved ones buried in Munich cemeteries in unmarked graves, their family plots or having them cremated, common practice in Germany for unclaimed bodies. The columns of the structures were recycled into brake shoes for municipal buses and new material for art galleries damaged in the war. The sarcophagi were melted down and given to the Munich tram service who used it for soldering material to repair rail and electrical lines damaged by the war.

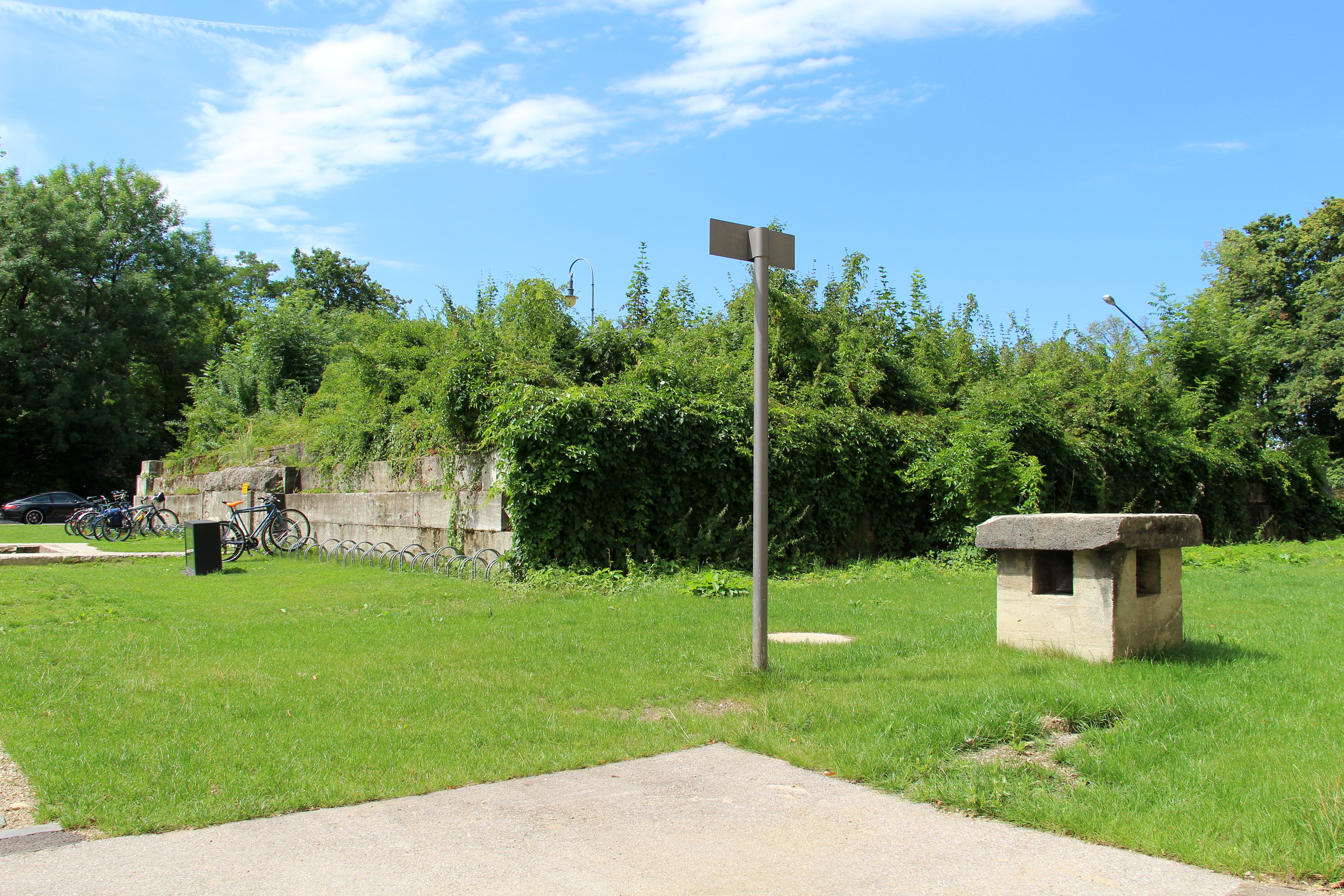
Temple site, 2017

On 9 January 1947, the upper parts of the structures were blown up. The centre portion was subsequently partially filled in but often filled with rain water which created a natural memorial. When Germany was reunited there were plans made for a biergarten, restaurant or café on the site of the Ehrentempel but these were derailed by the growth of rare biotope vegetation on the site. As a result of this, the temples were spared complete destruction and the foundation bases of the monuments remain, intersecting on the corner of Briennerstrasse and Arcisstrasse. In the intermittent period of the 1947 destruction and 1990 handover, basements (hitherto unknown to the Americans) were uncovered beneath the structures. A small plaque added in 2007 explains their function.

== Interments ==
- Felix Alfarth
- Andreas Bauriedl
- Theodor Casella
- Wilhelm Ehrlich
- Martin Faust
- Anton Hechenberger
- Oskar Körner
- Karl Kuhn
- Karl Laforce
- Kurt Neubauer
- Klaus von Pape
- Theodor von der Pfordten
- Johann Rickmers
- Max Erwin von Scheubner-Richter
- Lorenz Ritter von Stransky
- Adolf Wagner (buried in the grass mound between steps in 1944)
- Wilhelm Wolf

== See also ==
- Nazi architecture
- Denazification
- Völkisch movement
