= Loden-Frey =

German textile company

Lodenfrey
- Type: GmbH & Co. KG
- Industry: Textile industry
- Founded: 1842
- Founder: Johann Georg Frey
- Headquarters: Munich, Germany
- Key people: Markus Höhn
- Revenue: €88.5 million
- Number of employees: 333
- Website: lodenfrey.com

Lodenfrey (also Loden-Frey, proper spelling LODEN-FREY) is a German family business from Munich that produces Trachten and other clothes. The company was founded in 1842 and is run by the fifth (Lodenfrey Verkaufshaus GmbH) and sixth generation (Lodenfrey Fabrikation) descendants of the founder. After World War II, the company temporarily was the largest German textile company.

== History ==
=== Founding and initial successes ===
Lodenfrey was founded in 1842 by Johann Georg Frey. Frey, a half-orphan from Klingenstein near Ulm in Baden-Württemberg, acquired his first production licence in Munich that year and began weaving fine woollen fabrics. In 1844, Frey officially became a citizen of Munich. In addition to rather coarse and rough woollen fabrics such as loden, fine cloths made of silk, satin, or velvet were also produced. In 1850, the first shop was opened on Schrannenplatz, which later became Marienplatz, and was personally visited by King Maximilian II two years later.

In 1855, Frey developed the first water-repellent loden, which won the gold medal at Paris World Fair of the same year, and also attracted international attention. From then on, the German and Austrian nobility around Emperor Franz Joseph I wore hunting garments made of Lodenfrey loden, thus enabling the company to build its first own factory. The company's headquarters were relocated to the newly acquired Dianabad. In 1862, the first mechanical sheep's wool spinning mill and cloth and woollen goods factory were built there. A short time later, the Dianabad was sold, and in 1870, construction began on the spacious factory complex in Schwabing, today's Lodenfrey Park.

=== Growth and industrial production ===
With the completion of the new factory, Johann Georg's son, Johann Baptist, joined the management. The new factory site, right next to the Schwabing stream, meant that the means and space were now available to produce loden on a larger scale. Johann Baptist Frey was the driving force behind the development of loden. In 1872, he created a napped and impregnated fabric, the first functional material ever developed: knitted loden. Johann Baptist developed new advertising media, and in 1880 the first Lodenfrey sales catalogue was sent out worldwide. Previously known as Wollwarenfabrik (woollen goods factory), Johann Baptist renamed the factory Münchner Lodenfabrik Joh. Gg. Frey in 1897. The company grew steadily, especially around the turn of the century. In addition to the retail trade in Munich, Johann Baptist built up the mail order business. With winter sports becoming increasingly popular, Frey expanded its product range to include sporting goods. In 1902, a house in Maffeistraße was purchased and connected to the previous business, creating the sales outlet in Maffeistraße that still exists as of 2023. Johann Baptist died in 1920 and from then on his son-in-law, Oskar Stalf, ran the business until Frey's son Georg joined the management in 1928. In 1927, the factory in Osterwaldstraße was equipped with its own clothing factory, enabling the industrial manufacture of loden coats. Construction of the Bavarian Zugspitze Railway began in 1928. The workers wore coats from Lodenfrey to protect them from the weather. The coats were subsequently also sold in specialist shops throughout Germany and artists were engaged for adverts and posters.

Lodenfrey also introduced a number of employee benefits. As early as the 1930s, a pension association and a staff newspaper were founded, and a swimming pool was built for employees. In the 1950s, Lodenfrey established Germany's first company kindergarten including a baby care centre, founded its own company health insurance fund and created a company library and spacious residential buildings for production employees.

=== Further expansion and the Third Reich ===
Further sales outlets were established, in Dresden in 1929, in Vienna in 1934, in Brussels in 1937 and also in Stockholm. However, World War II brought the expansion to a halt.

Like many companies, Lodenfrey also profited from Aryanization during the Nazi era and employed concentration camp prisoners and forced labourers. Since August 1942, prisoners from the Dachau concentration camp had to perform forced labour. A permanent camp with around 30 prisoners existed from June 1944 to April 1945. Lodenfrey employed both civilian forced labourers and prisoners from the Dachau concentration camp in production and for clean-up work in Osterwaldstraße. According to former forced labourers, prisoners and employees, there were between 20 and 30 prisoners and 8 civilian forced labourers. Between 1944 and April 1945, the prisoners were also housed on the Lodenfrey site. The forced labourers at Lodenfrey were provided with civilian clothes, they received additional food and were allowed to use the swimming pool. Nine of the forced labourers were presumably helped to escape. Furthermore, there was no enrichment through low labour costs, meaning that the forced labourers were paid the same as the German workers. However, they helped to keep production running.

During the Nazi dictatorship, Lodenfrey produced uniforms. The company advertised itself as a "clothing store for the brown soldier, for Hitler boys and Hitler girls". The production of armaments during the war is difficult to reconstruct because, on one hand, the documents were almost completely destroyed during air raids in 1944 and 1945 and, on the other hand, witness statements and denazification procedures on this subject are not always credible. There is evidence that in 1934, Lodenfrey advertised in part by producing Hitler Youth uniforms. In addition, the stock and sales lists from the Lodenfrey archives indicate that uniforms were produced. Whether Lodenfrey endeavoured to obtain orders for the Wehrmacht or the NSDAP cannot be answered unequivocally either. The textile industry in particular was heavily regulated by the regime, and those companies that adhered to state requirements had a strong advantage. Lodenfrey can, however, be described with relative certainty as an economic profiteer.

In 1996, Lodenfrey announced that there was no material in the company archive on the subject of Aryanization. At the end of 2000, however, the company took part in the compensation for forced labourers and commissioned an expert report on Lodenfrey during the Nazi era. All purchases by the Frey and Nagel families and thus the Aryanizations of Neuner & Basch, Cohen and Eichengrün were considered in the Aryanization process, whereby only the cases of Cohen and Eichengrün were classified as Aryanization. Restitution was paid after the war and the companies and properties of the Eichengrün company were returned in full. Lodenfrey contributed a total of DM 150,000 to the compensation of former forced labourers by the Foundation Remembrance, Responsibility and Future in 2000.

=== After World War II ===
After the war, many of the 1,000 or so people employed by Lodenfrey returned to help rebuild the factory and shop, both of which had been destroyed by bombs. Lodenfrey now ironed and sewed for the American occupiers and sold coats in private houses and the ruins until they were rebuilt. After World War II, Lodenfrey became one of the largest German textile companies, with around 2,000 employees.

In 1947, Lodenfrey's business activities were split up. While the Frey family continued to focus on production, Karl Erich Nagel, husband of the great-granddaughter of the company founder and son-in-law of Oscar Stalf, took over the Verkaufshaus in Munich am Dom.

=== Lodenfrey Verkaufshaus ===
After temporary retail premises in Kaufingerstraße 23 and the makeshift sales department in Frey's private villa, a new department store was built in Maffeistraße under the direction of Karl-Erich Nagel after the end of the war. The reopening was celebrated in September 1949. In 1957, the manufacturing and Verkaufshaus were legally separated. Lodenfrey Verkaufshaus GmbH was founded. In addition to loden and fashion from its own production, Lodenfrey also began selling third-party collections and set the course for the development from a traditional fashion shop to a department store.

A generational change took place in 1971. Karl-Erich Nagel left the company and his children Ilse-Janine Rid and Ralph-Michael Nagel took over as the fifth generation; both joined the company as managing partners. In 1991, the brother of Ralph-Michael Nagel and Ilse-Janine Rid, York-Thomas Nagel, joined the company as a further managing partner and was a member of the management team until 2004. In 1995, Ralph-Michael Nagel took over the company shares from his sister Ilse-Janine Rid, who retired as managing director. Markus Höhn joined the management team in 2002 and was the first non -family member to become a shareholder in the company in 2005. The online shop was launched in 2010. In 2013, after four years of construction, the most extensive renovation in the history of the store was completed, during which the sales area was expanded to 7,500 square metres.

=== Lodenfrey Fabrikation ===
The Frey family continued to expand the Lodenfrey manufacturing division under the leadership of the fourth generation Herbert and Bernhard Frey and founded companies in New York City (1948), Bad Ischl (1950), Malta (1970), France and Belgium. The company exported to over 40 countries worldwide. By 1950, the factory was once again producing 50,000 loden coats. At home, Lodenfrey won the City of Munich Fashion Award in 1979.

In 1995, Sabine, Peter and Stefan Frey, the fifth generation, took over the company. An administration and logistics centre was set up in Garching and production sites in Hungary and Romania. In 1996, Lodenfrey Fabrikation took over the traditional Bavarian company Zeiler, which specialised in leather clothing, and subsequently moved its headquarters to Garching.

== Corporate Structure ==
The managing partner of Lodenfrey Verkaufshaus GmbH & Co. KG has been Markus Höhn since 2005. He is the first non-family shareholder in the history of the company. In 2022, Lodenfrey employed 333 people and generated net sales of €88.5 million. His only sales location is the six-storey Lodenfrey department store in Maffeistraße in Munich, which has been family-owned since 1902. In addition to over-the-counter sales, Lodenfrey has also been selling goods via its online shop since 2010. The logistics centre is located in Garching.

A distinction is thus to be made between Lodenfrey Park, the former production site and now a business park at Munich's English Garden, the Lodenfrey Verkaufshaus GmbH with the department store in Munich city centre and online shop, and the manufacturing company Lodenfrey Fabrikation in Garching. Lodenfrey-Park GmbH is based in Munich and managed by Rudolf Reichl and Markus Hofmann. Lodenfrey Fabrikation (Lodenfrey Menswear GmbH) has its headquarters in Garching near Munich and employed 15 people in 2021. The managing directors are Sabine Frey, Klaus Faust, Antonia von Pfister and Leonhard von Pfister.

== Products ==
Lodenfrey offers contemporary fashion for women, men, and children as well as traditional fashion. In 2021, Polo Ralph Lauren established "Ralph's Coffee" at Lodenfrey as one of the first locations. In 2022, lifestyle products like (home) accessories, design items, books, fragrances, and cosmetics as well as a selection of vintage products were added on the ground floor of the building.

Since 2017, the following franchise shops have also opened in the immediate vicinity of the Lodenfrey store: Luisa Cerano at Fünf Höfe; Marc Cain at Fünf Höfe; Sportalm at Schäfflerhof; Hemisphere at Schäfflerhof.

== Awards for Loden-Frey Verkaufshaus GmbH & Co. KG ==
- 2003: Bavarian Retail Quality Award (Bayerischer Qualitätspreis im Einzelhandel)
- 2005: Rudolf-Egerer-Award
- 2014: German Retail Award in the category Management Performance for SMEs (Deutscher Handelspreis in der Kategorie Managementleistung Mittelstand)
- 2015: Rudolf-Egerer-Award
