= Arco-Palais =

Coordinates: 48°08′23″N 11°34′32″E

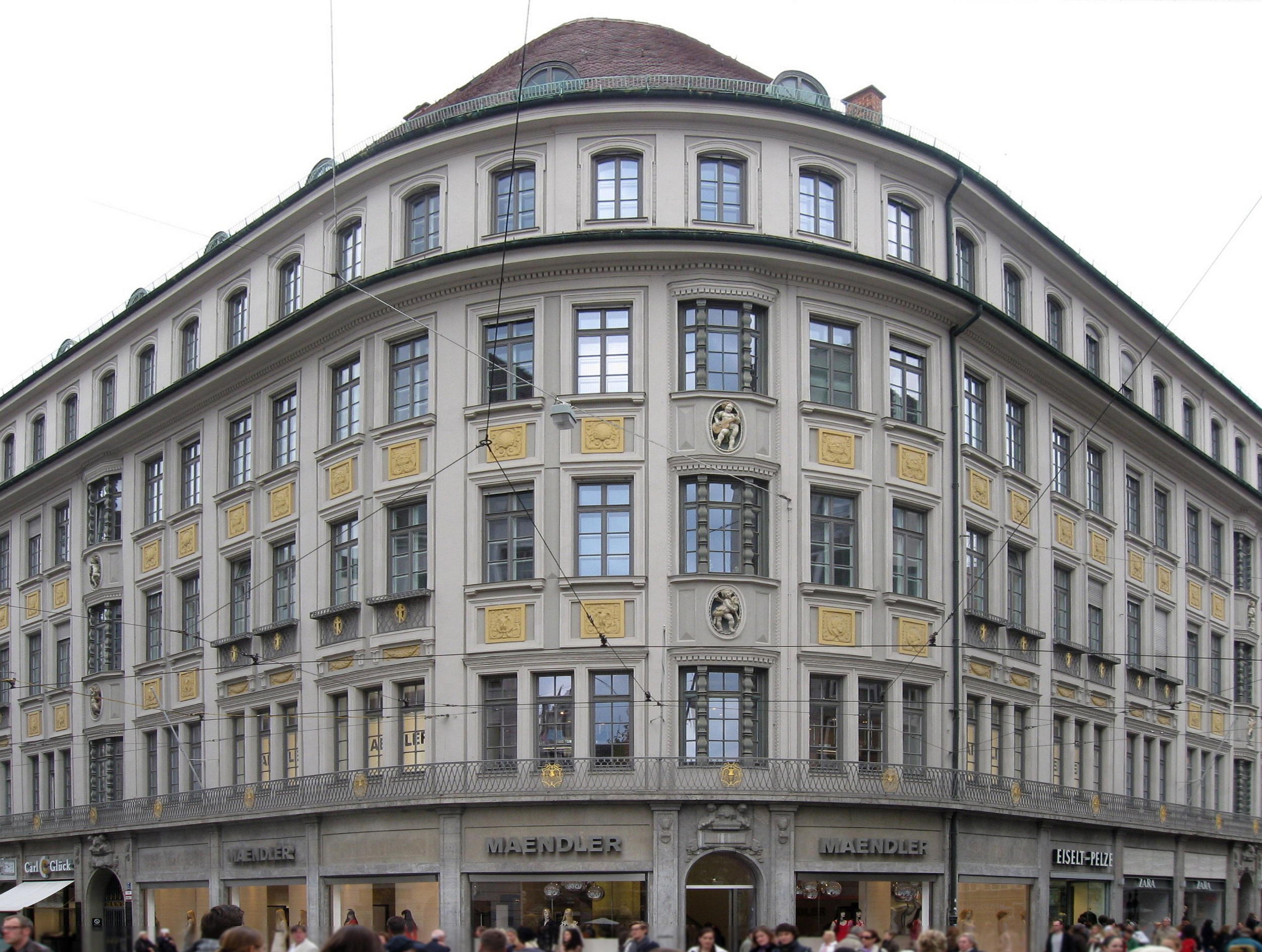
Arco-Palais

The Arco-Palais is a commercial building in Munich's Old Town, Theatinerstraße 7, at the corner of Theatinerstraße / Maffeistraße. Together with the building at Maffeistraße 4, it forms a building block which is registered as a historical monument in the Bavarian Monument List.

== History ==
The building was erected in 1908–1910 in accordance to plans of Georg Meister and Oswald Bieber. Until 1937 it was owned by the Bavarian noble house of Arco.

Among others, Heinrich Thannhauser's Modern Gallery had its exhibition rooms in the building, whose entrance hall is decorated with frescos by Reinhold Max Eichler depicting the Four Seasons. The first exhibition of the Neue Künstlervereinigung München (N.K.V.M.) took place there in December 1909. The second followed in September 1910, and on 18 December 1911 the third exhibition of the N.K.V.M. opened at the same time as the first exhibition of Der Blaue Reiter in the same building but on a different floor. The Thannhauser Gallery existed until 1928.
