= Blutzeuge =

Nazi neologism

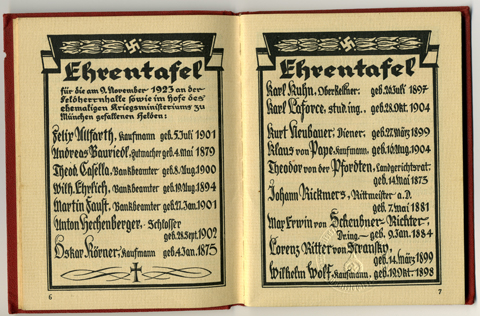
A 1935 Nazi Party publication roll of honor list for members killed in the Beer Hall Putsch in 1923.

Blutzeuge (German for "blood witness", plural Blutzeugen) was a term used in Nazi Germany during the early 20th century for members of the National Socialist German Workers' Party (NSDAP) and associated organizations considered to be martyrs. Blutzeuge was used in Nazi propaganda in the 1930s and 1940s to depict a hero cult of "fallen" Nazis who had been murdered by opponents in the political violence in Germany during the Weimar Republic and after the Nazi seizure of control in January 1933. Adolf Hitler dedicated his book Mein Kampf to the sixteen NSDAP members killed in the 1923 Beer Hall Putsch.

== Notable Blutzeugen ==
- Max Erwin von Scheubner-Richter, early prominent NSDAP member and close associate of Adolf Hitler, killed in the Beer Hall Putsch in 1923.
- Albert Leo Schlageter, member of the Freikorps, executed for sabotage in the Occupation of the Ruhr in 1923.
- Horst Wessel, leading member of the Sturmabteilung in Berlin, assassinated by communists in 1930.
- Herbert Norkus, 15-year-old member of the Hitler Youth murdered in 1932 in a fight with Roter Frontkämpferbund youths.
- Wilhelm Gustloff, founder of the NSDAP/AO branch in Davos, Switzerland, assassinated in 1936.

== Gallery ==
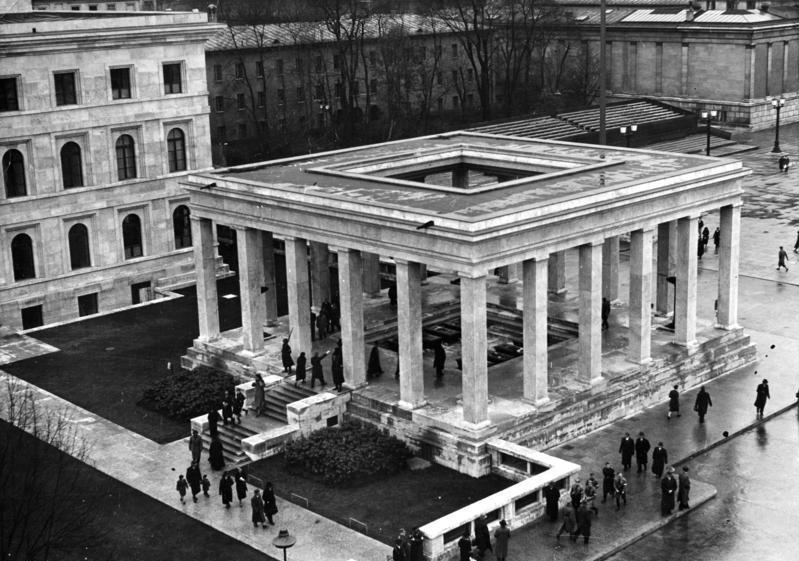
1936 photo of the "Ehrentempel" honoring the Blutzeuge at Königsplatz, Munich

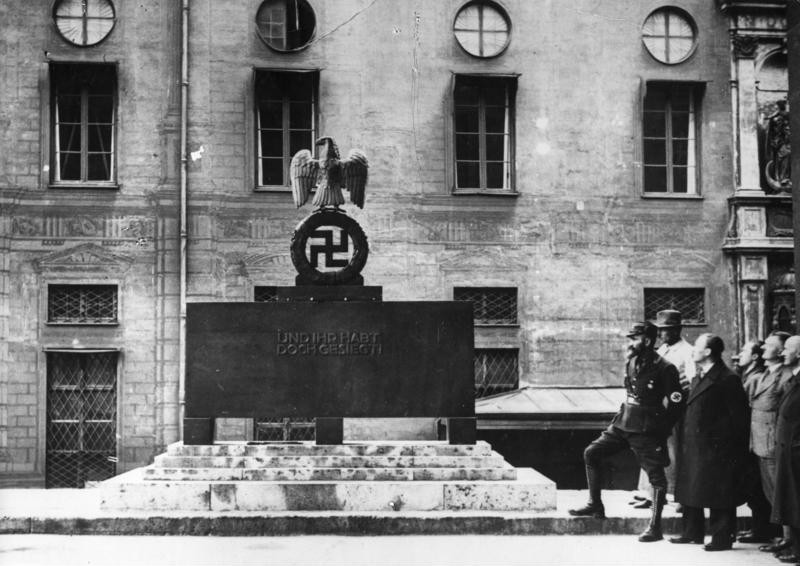
1933 photo of the Nazi memorial for Blutzeugen in Munich, which could be bypassed by the "Drückebergergasse" ("Shirker's Alley")

== See also ==
- Martyr
