= Drückebergergasse =

Pedestrian street in Munich, Germany

Coordinates: 48.14133°N 11.57719°E

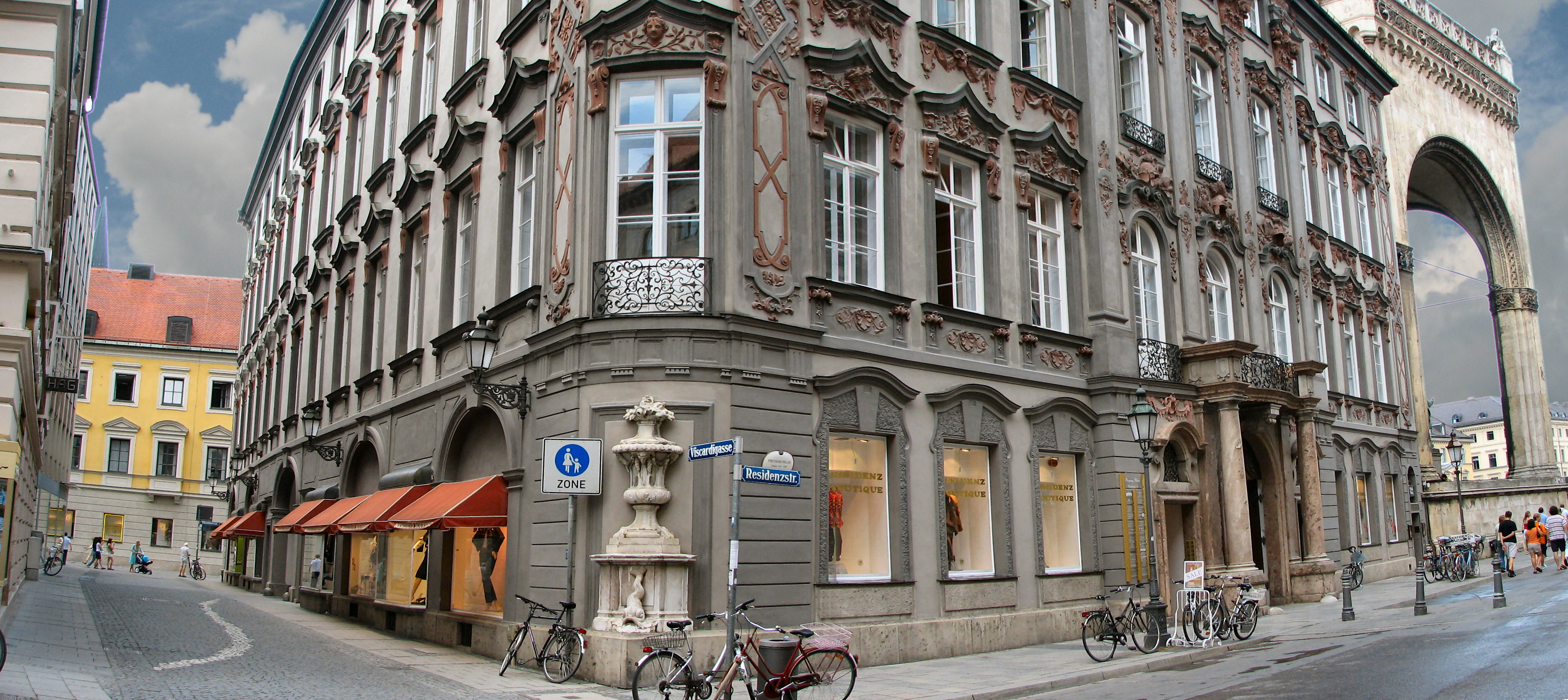
View from Residenzstraße: Viscardigasse on the left, the eastern side of the Feldherrnhalle on the far right, where the SS posts stood, can be seen

Drückebergergasse ('Shirker's Alley') is the popular name for Viscardigasse, a narrow, curbless pedestrian street in Munich, Germany, just over fifty metres (yards) long and paved with stone setts throughout. The street is officially named after the Swiss Baroque architect Giovanni Antonio Viscardi. The nickname is from the 1930s, as locals used it to bypass the nearby Nazi memorial to the martyrs of the 1923 Beer Hall Putsch to avoid the requirement to perform a Hitler salute to the guarded structure.

== Origin of the name ==
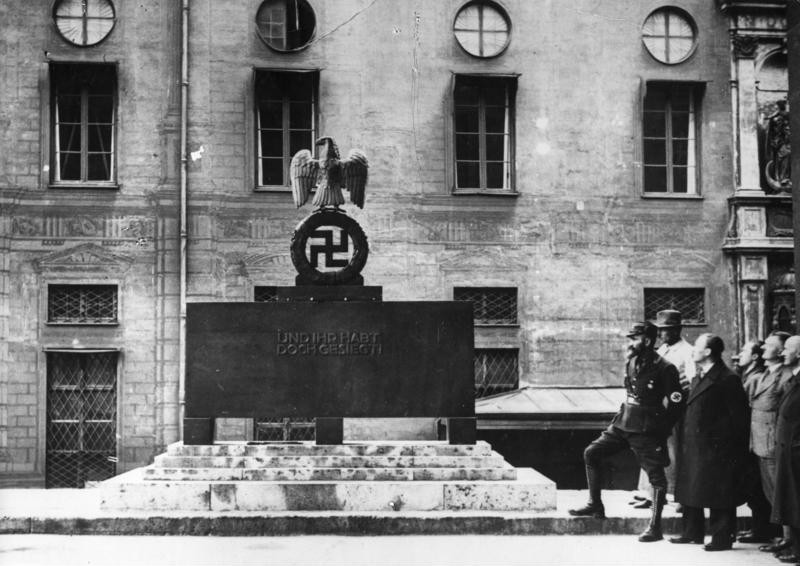
1933 photo of the Nazi Ehrenmal shrine at Feldherrnhalle

On 9 November 1923, Adolf Hitler's failed coup d'état, which aimed to overthrow the Weimar Republic, failed in front of the Feldherrnhalle. Fifteen of the putschists, later referred to as blood witnesses of the movement, four police officers, and one bystander were killed. In the years that followed, the Feldherrnhalle became a National Socialist memorial site. In 1933, when the Nazis came to power, a memorial was erected on its eastern side, facing Residenzstraße, bearing the names of the killed putschists and an inscription which translated to "And yet you have triumphed". From that time onward, parades and oath-taking ceremonies were held there. During the period of Nazi rule, an SS honour guard stood in front of the memorial day and night. All passers-by were expected to give an honour salute in the form of the Nazi salute at this location. Those who wished to avoid this could bypass that section of Residenzstraße by taking a detour through the small Viscardigasse and Theatinerstraße to the west of the Feldherrnhalle. In reference to the fact that many people avoided giving the Hitler salute in this way, the citizens of Munich at the time referred to the narrow street at the rear of the Feldherrnhalle as Drückebergergassl.

== Dismantling ==
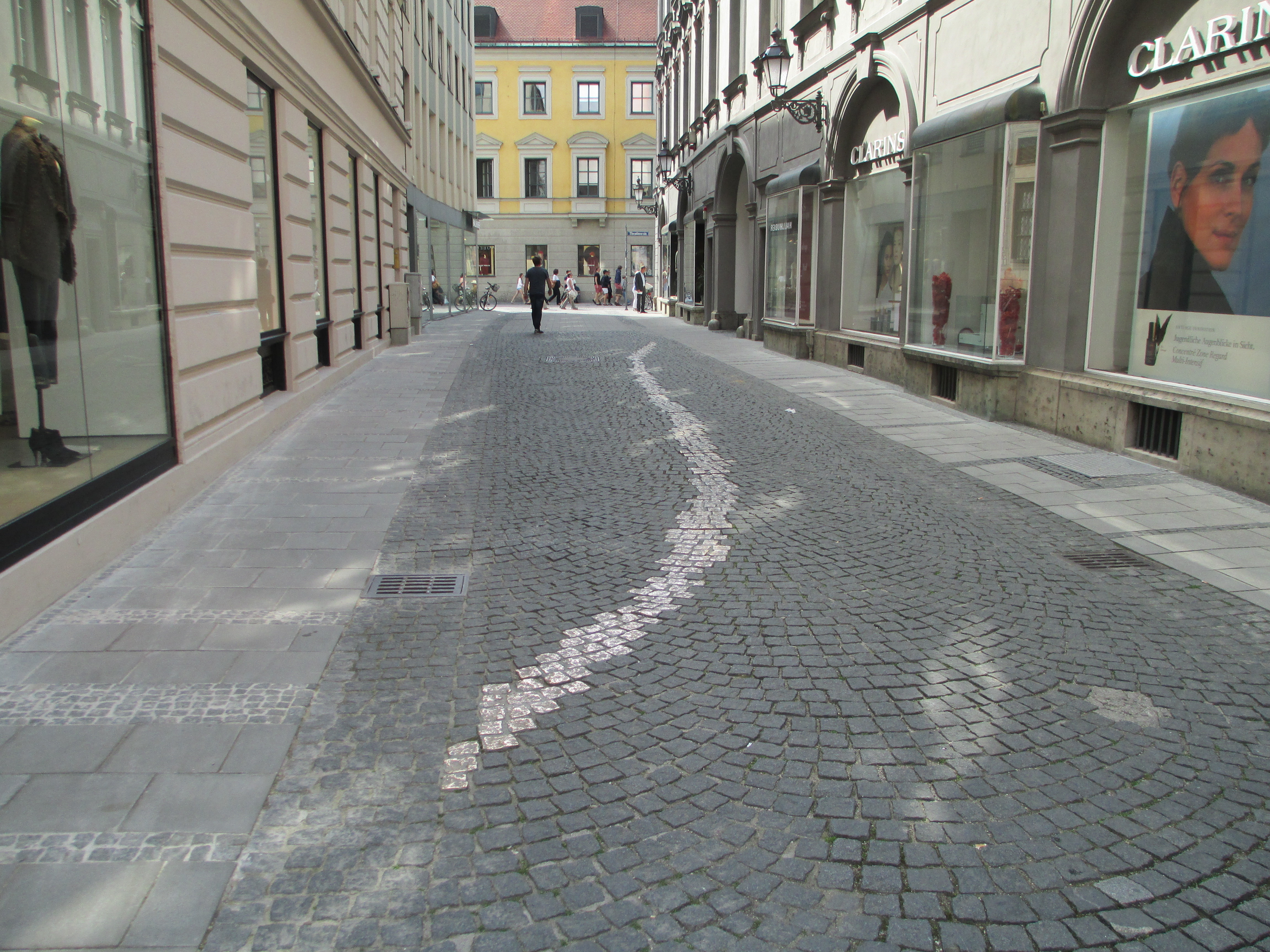
Argumente

After the entry of United States Armed Forces, the Seventh United States Army ordered the Nazi memorial to be dismantled and melted down on 3 May 1945. In a historical context, Drückebergergasse is still commonly used during guided city tours, visits by tourists, or urban history walks to illustrate the quiet civic resistance of some residents of the Bavarian state capital to the National Socialist regime. To commemorate this, in 1995 an approximately 30-centimetre (12 inch) wide bronze trail, designed by the sculptor and bronze caster Bruno Wank, was set into the stone paving of Viscardigasse along the route of the detour taken at the time. The work, titled Argumente, consists of an S-shaped curved line. The trail was created by replacing existing paving stones with untreated bronze cubes, which over time acquired a polished surface through contact with passers-by.
