= Fünf Höfe =

Shopping mall in Munich, Germany

Coordinates: 48°08′25″N 11°34′31″E

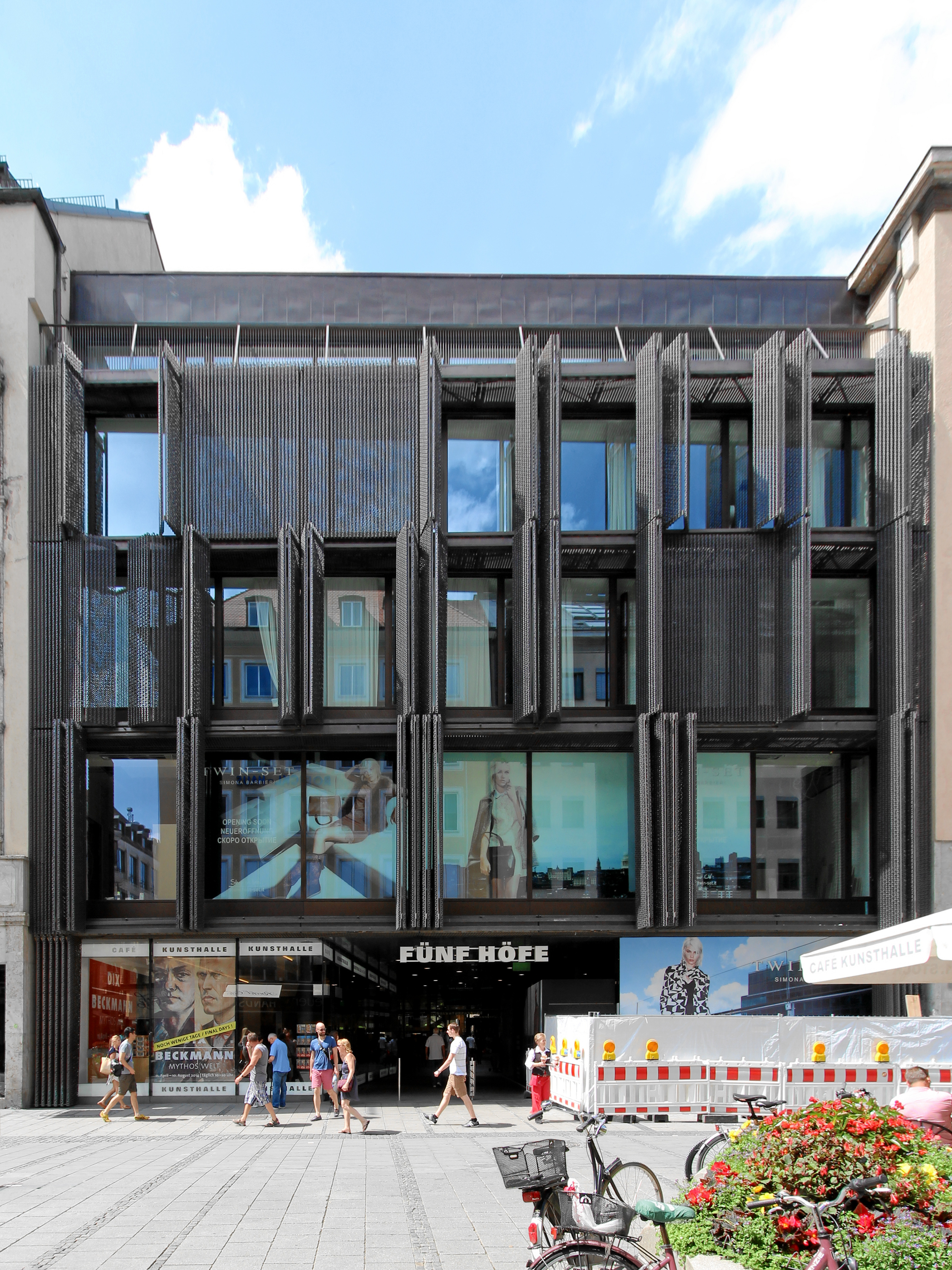
Entrance of Fünf Höfen at Theatinerstraße

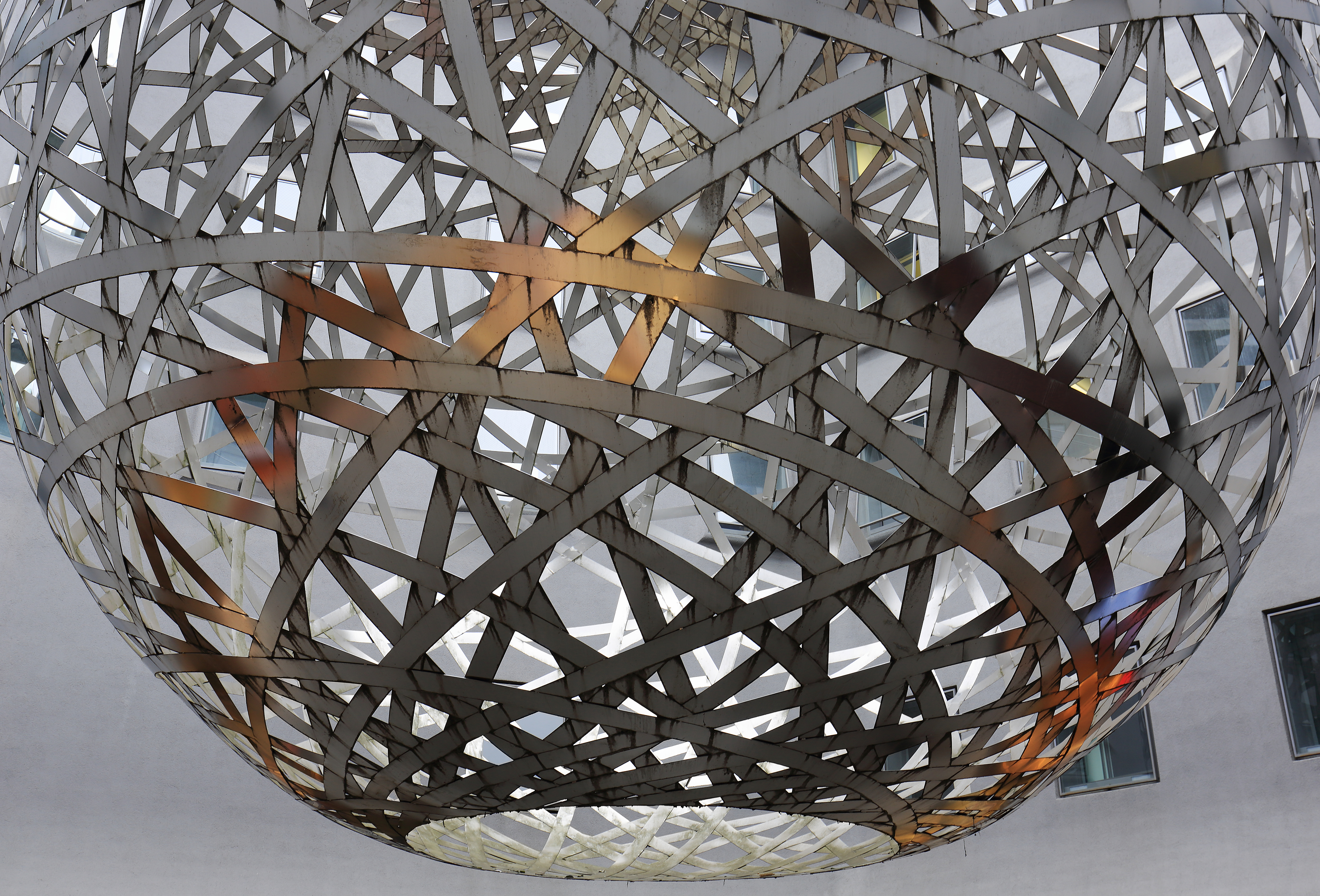
Sphere of steel mesh, designed by Olafur Eliasson in Viscardihof

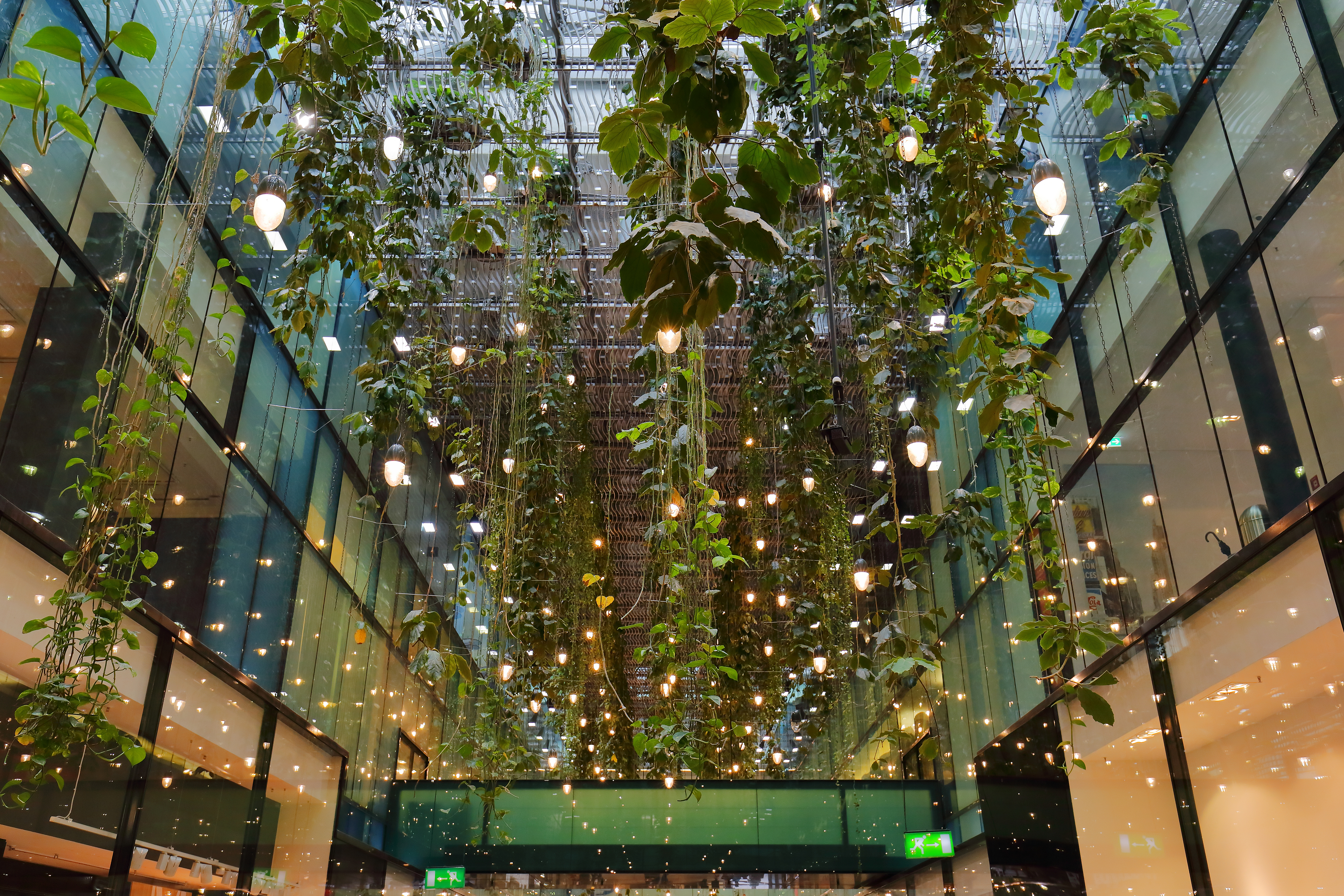
Hanging Gardens by Tita Giese

Fünf Höfe (Five Courtyards) is a shopping mall in the center of Munich. Fünf Höfe was created from 1998 to 2003 after the coring of a HypoVereinsbank building complex. In 2004, the Fünf Höfe was sold to DIFA (today Union Investment Real Estate AG) and since then the official name has been CityQuartier Fünf Höfe. It is located in the area of Salvator-, Theatiner-, Kardinal-Faulhaber-Straße.

== Description ==
In total, the Fünf Höfe offers their visitors, on the approximately 14,000 square meter area, around 60 stores and about 2,500 square meters of cafés and restaurants. They also include the Hypo-Kunsthalle (approximately 3,200 m^{2} of floor space), which displays temporary exhibitions on changing themes, artists and epochs.

In addition, there are 24,300 m^{2} of office space as well as some 3,200 m^{2} of apartments, which from the passages are hardly noticeable.

The shops and pubs are predominantly related to the upscale price classes.

== History ==
The plan for the redesign of the whole block was the first international competition success of Basel architects Jacques Herzog and Pierre de Meuron in 1994. The client was the Fünf Höfe GmbH & Co KG represented through HVB Immobilien AG (a subsidiary of the then HypoVereinsbank)

In the long-term preservation of the façades and parts of the old building, Herzog & de Meuron radically altered the old town block, which had been closed down until then, and made it into an ensemble of courtyards and passages with different views and insights, in which each courtyard should have its own character. In the first phase, completed on 8 February 2001, the Perusa- and Portiahof as well as the Pranner- and a part of the Salvatorpassage and the Hypo-Kunsthalle were created. The architect Ivano Gianola planned the Maffeihof and designed the area to the south of the Fünf Höfe into the Schäfflerhof. In the second phase, which was inaugurated on 19 March 2003, the Munich architecture firm Hilmer & Sattler und Albrecht designed the façade to Salvatorstrasse.

== Art ==
Some of the courtyards and passages are decorated with works of art:

- In the Salvatorpassage the "Hanging Gardens" by Tita Giese was installed.
- In the Prannerpassage, glass sequined mosaics made of round-cut, clear window glass are inserted into the gray exposed concrete in the walls and ceilings on 317 m^{2} of the Mayer'sche Hofkunstanstalt, creating a glitter effects.
- The "Sphere", a large hanging ball made of steel mesh designed by Olafur Eliasson, is displayed in the Viscardihof.

== Website ==
- Official website
