= Odeonsplatz =

Square in central Munich, Germany

Coordinates: 48°08′32″N 11°34′39″E

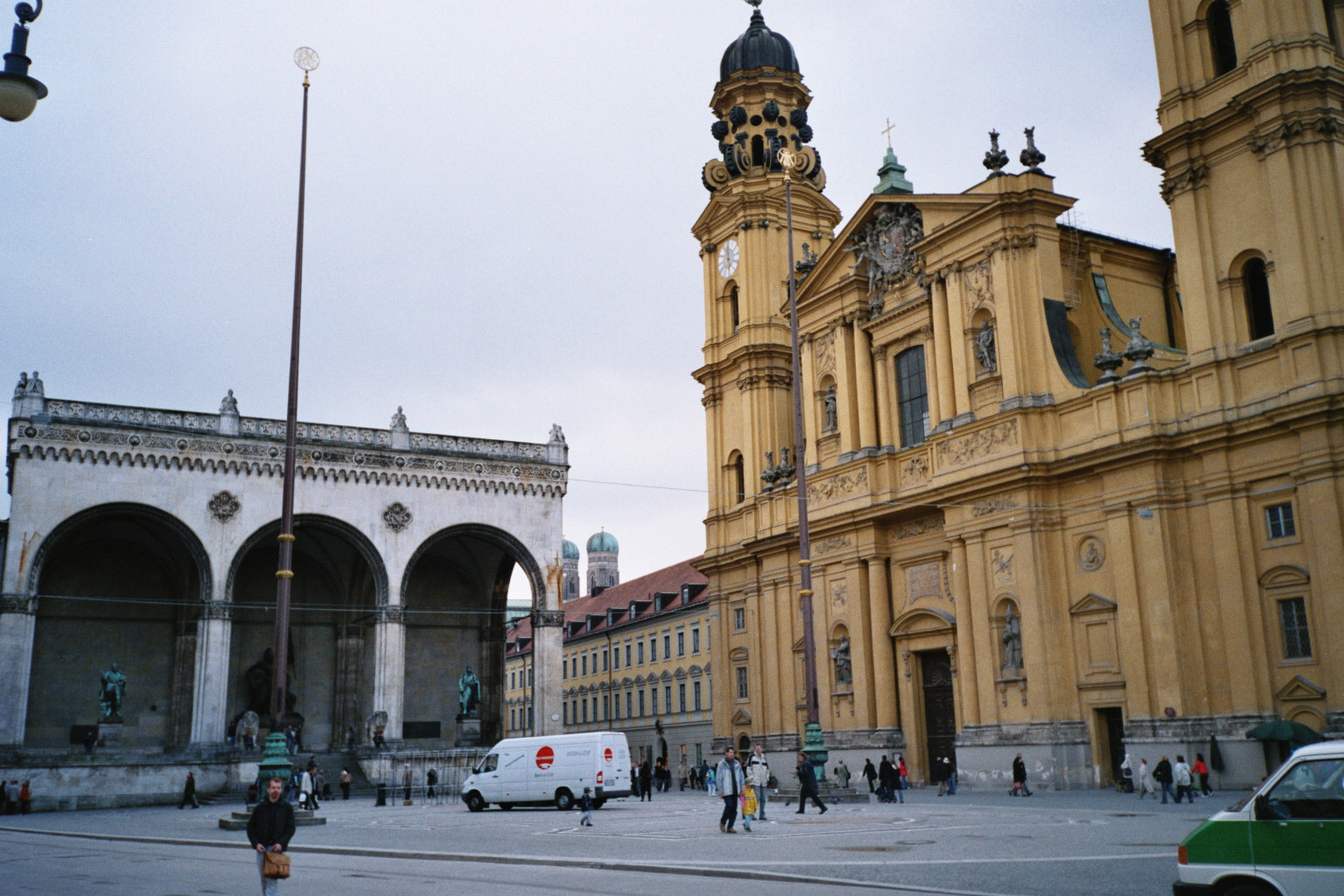
View from the Odeonsplatz on to the Feldherrnhalle (l) and the Theatinerkirche (r)

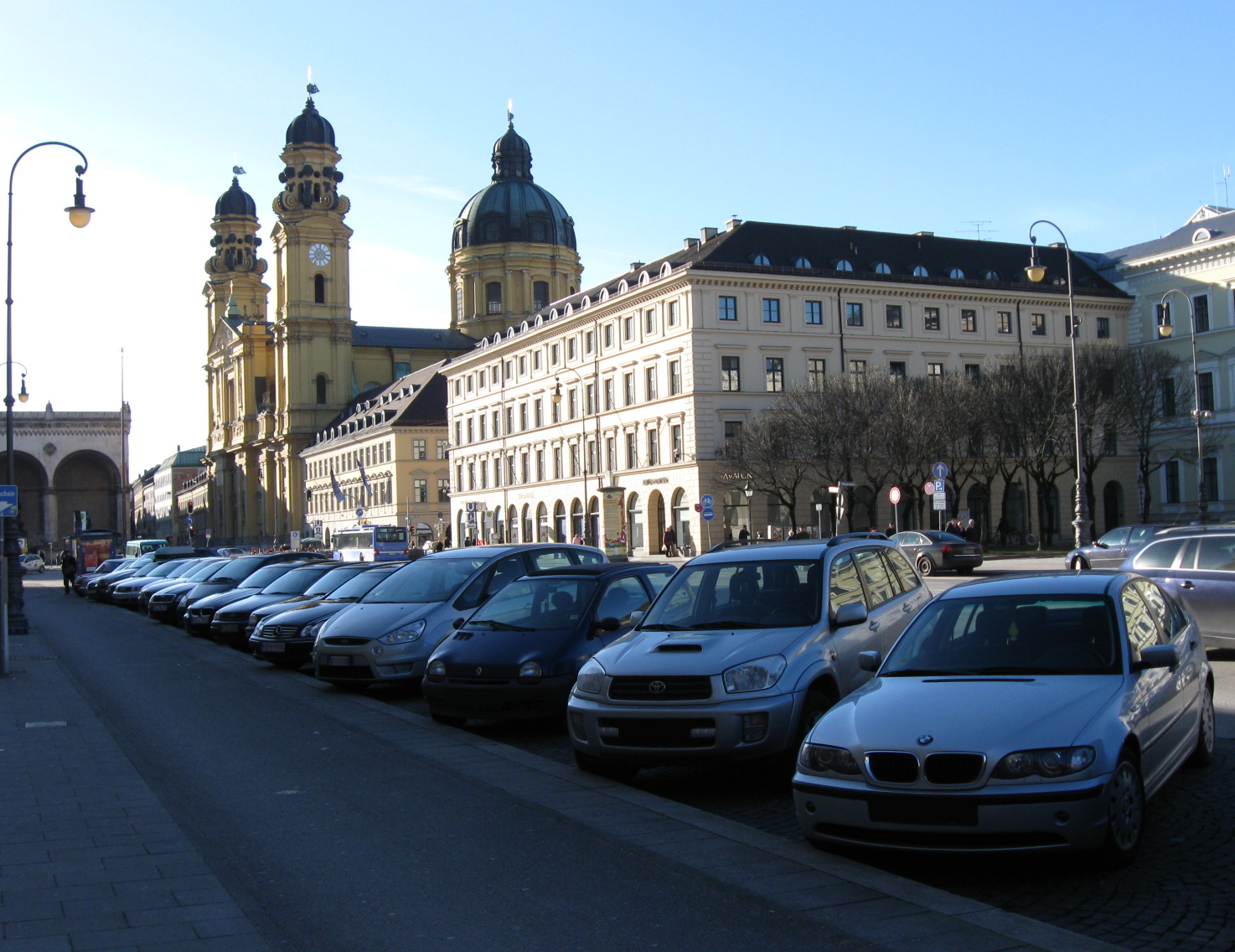
West side of the Odeonsplatz, looking south to the Theatine Church and Feldherrnhalle

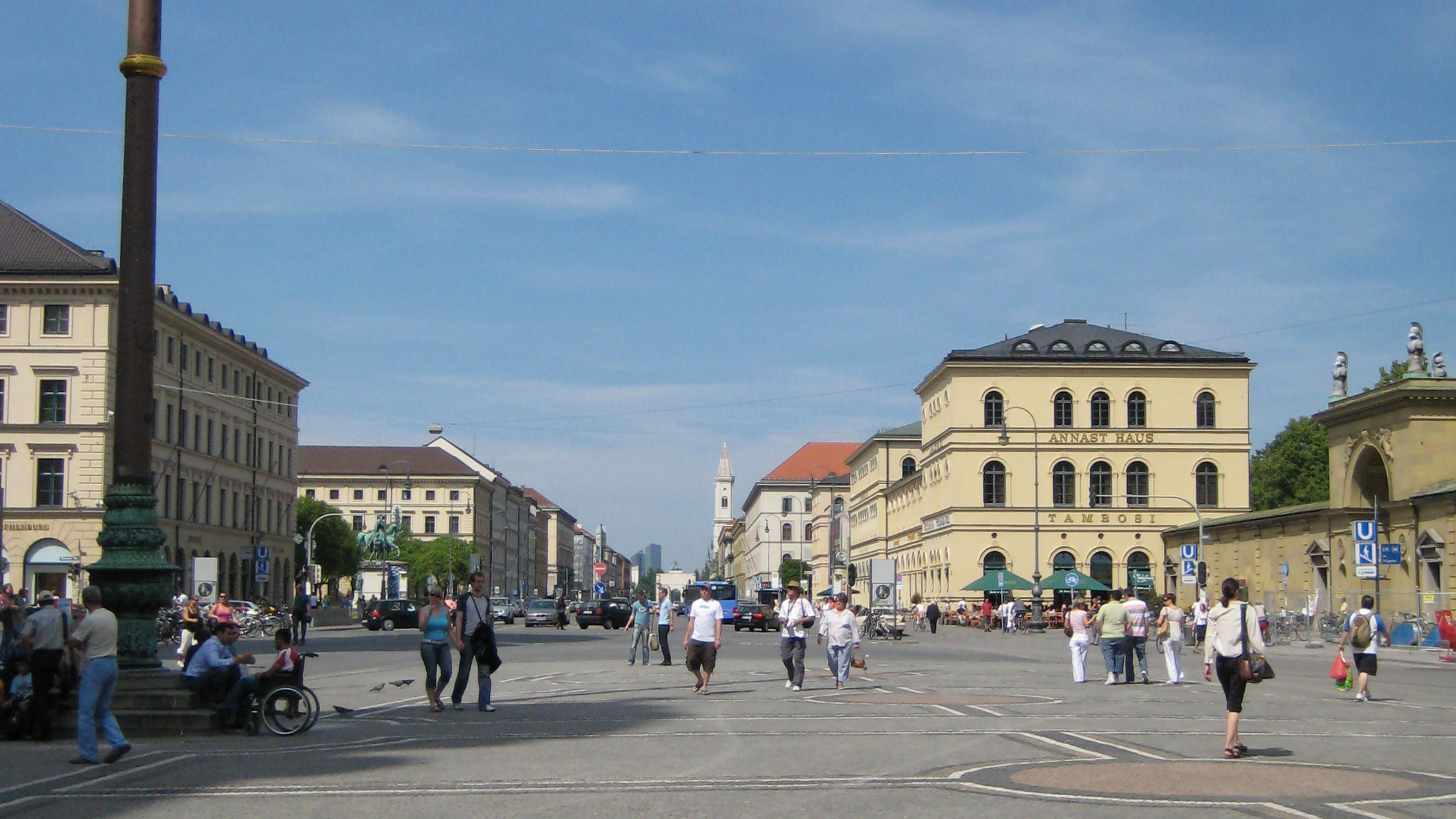
View north through the Ludwigstraße

The Odeonsplatz is a large square in central Munich which was developed in the early 19th century by Leo von Klenze and is at the southern end of the Ludwigstraße, developed at the same time. The square is named for the former concert hall, the Odeon, on its northwestern side. The name Odeonsplatz has come to be extended to the parvis (forecourt) of the Residenz, in front of the Theatine Church and terminated by the Feldherrnhalle, which lies to the south of it. The square was the scene of a fatal gun battle which ended the march on the Feldherrnhalle during the 1923 Beer Hall Putsch.

== Location and buildings ==
The Odeonsplatz is located north of the Old Town, on the border between Altstadt-Lehel (to the east) and Maxvorstadt (to the west). On the west side, which is set back from the line of the Ludwigstraße, are the building of the Odeon (1826–28, now the Bavarian Ministry of the Interior) and the identical Palais Leuchtenberg (1817–21, now the Bavarian State Ministry of Finance), both modelled on the Palazzo Farnese in Rome. On the east side is Klenze's Bazaar Building, including the Café Tambosi. Between the two buildings on the west side, an unnamed street leads to the Palais Ludwig Ferdinand (1825–26, now the headquarters of Siemens). Both this street and the Brienner Straße, which begins at the south end of the square, lead to the adjacent Wittelsbacherplatz, also designed by Klenze.

The Feldherrnhalle is a copy of the famous Loggia dei Lanzi in Florence.

The Odeonsplatz is served by the U Bahn station of the same name and by the Museenlinie (museum line) of the Munich bus system. Since 1972, the southern end of the square has been part of the central Munich pedestrian zone.

== History ==
As early as 1790, plans were made in connection with the removal of the old city walls to replace the Schwabing Gate (Schwabinger Tor) with a new square and to make the beginning of the route from the Residenz to Nymphenburg Palace (the Fürstenweg, now Brienner Straße) more impressive. The current form of the square and the parvis to the south of it was determined by King Ludwig I of Bavaria, who in 1816, while still Crown Prince, commissioned Klenze to lay out the whole of the Ludwigstraße, including the square at its southern end. The Italianate neo-classical style of the first building, the Palais Leuchtenberg, set the tone, and unlike earlier plans by Friedrich Ludwig von Sckell which had featured buildings surrounded by a parklike setting, Klenze created an enclosed urban square to better fit with the adjacent Old Town. However, the Feldherrnhalle, erected to close the view at the southern end on the site of the demolished gate, was commissioned from Klenze's rival Friedrich von Gärtner in 1840–41. As the building of the square continued, the project expanded to include the new Ludwigstraße; originally it had been intended as a central square. As a result, the obelisk in memory of the Bavarian troops who had died fighting with Napoleon in his Russian campaign was instead erected in the Karolinenplatz in 1833. In 1862 an equestrian statue of Ludwig I was added at the mouth of the street between the Odeon and the Palais Leuchtenberg; it was designed by Ludwig von Schwanthaler and executed by Max von Widnmann.

The Odeonsplatz has traditionally been an important site of parades and public events, including funeral processions (most recently for Franz Josef Strauss in 1988), victory parades (most recently for the Bavarian troops who took part in the Franco-Prussian War of 1871), which proceeded down the Ludwigstraße to the Feldherrnhalle, with the VIP rostrum usually being located at the statue of Ludwig I. The annual parade to the Oktoberfest still follows this route.

According to many historians, this traditional function was the reason for the Nazi march on the Feldherrnhalle on 9 November 1923 in the course of the Beer Hall Putsch, which ended in a gunfight in which four state police officers and 16 Nazis were killed. During the Third Reich, the annual memorial march passed through the square and continued to the Königsplatz, where the Nazi fallen had been interred. A memorial was erected for them to the east of the Feldherrnhalle, which all passersby were required to honour with the Hitler salute; this was demolished in 1945 and the four police officers, including Nikolaus Hollweg, remembered with a plaque on the pavement and in 2010 with one on the wall of the Residenz.

The Odeonsplatz was also the subject of at least one painting by Hitler. Hitler is featured in a photograph of the Odeonsplatz taken by Heinrich Hoffmann showing Munich's cheering crowds celebrating the outbreak of the First World War on 2 August 1914; however, the picture is suspected of having been doctored to add him.

Together with the Marienplatz, the Odeonsplatz remains an important site for both civic events and demonstrations.

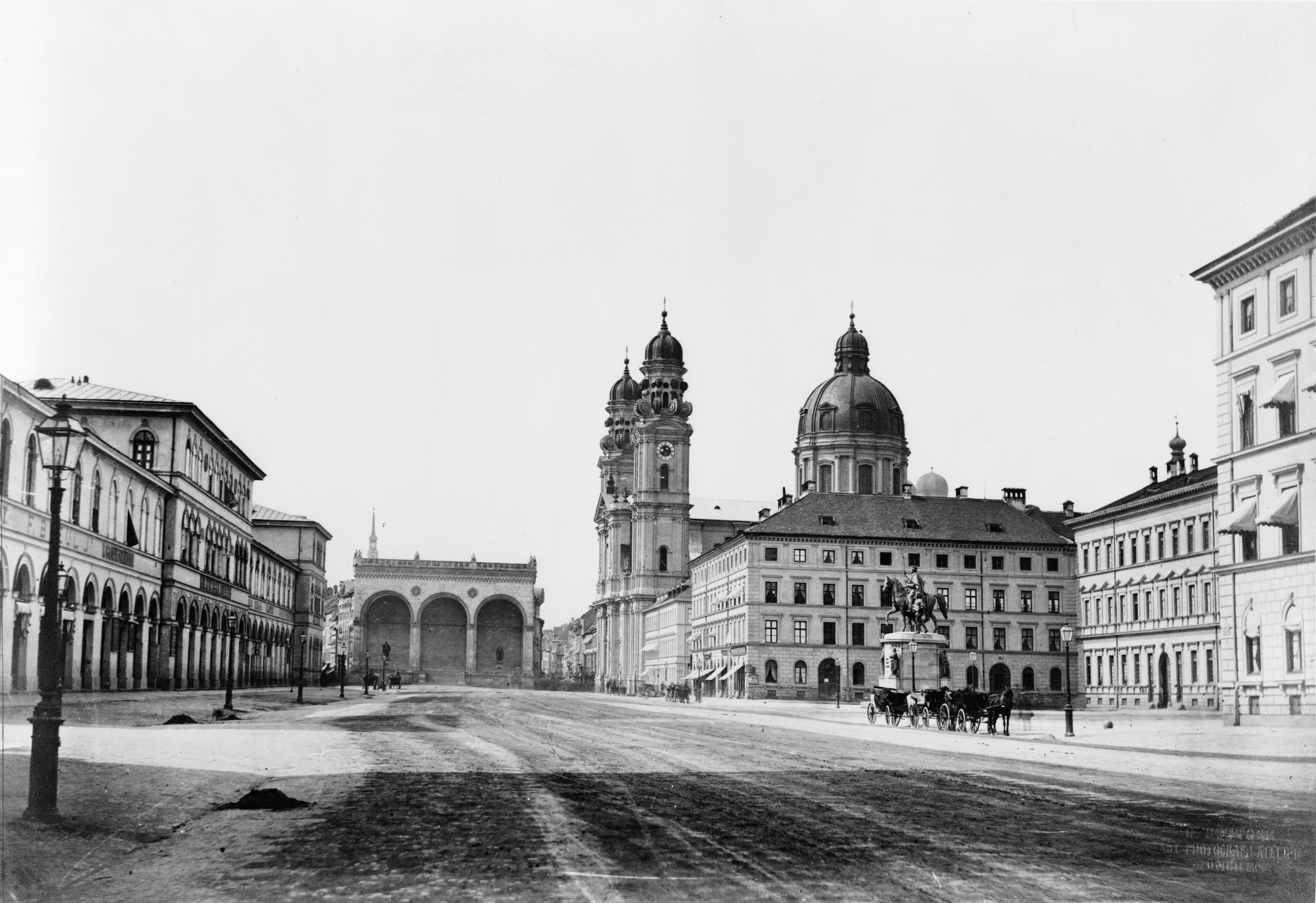
Pre-1891 photograph looking south to the Feldherrnhalle from the Odeonsplatz

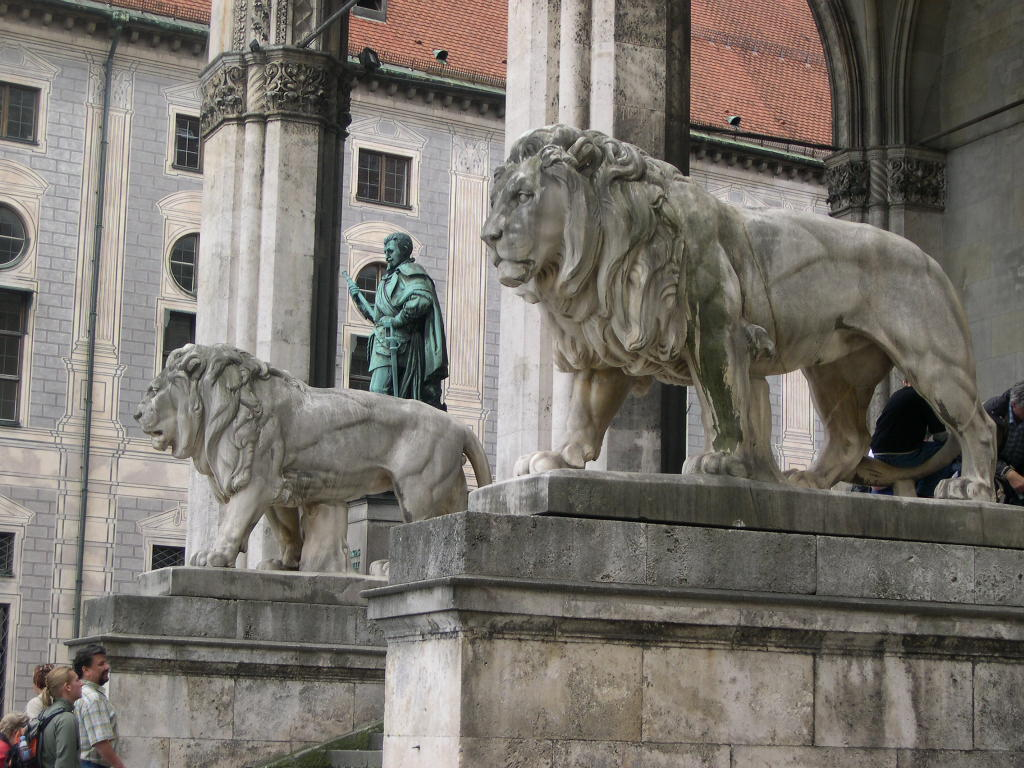
Lion sculptures by Wilhelm von Rümann at the Feldherrnhalle

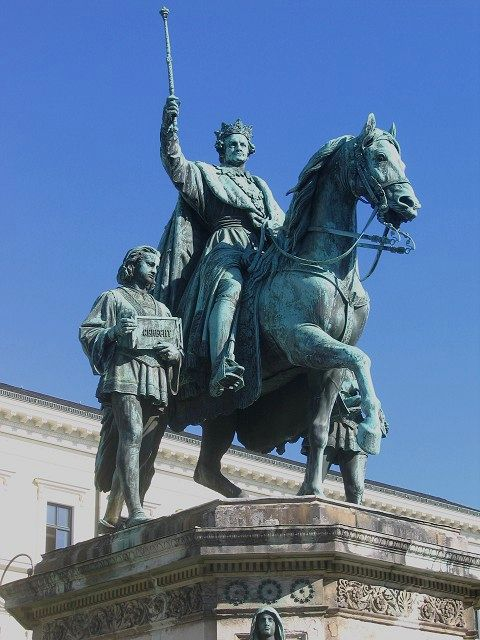
Equestrian statue of Ludwig I by Max von Widnmann on the west side of the square
