= Feldherrnhalle =

Monumental loggia in Munich, Germany

Coordinates: 48°08′29″N 11°34′38″E

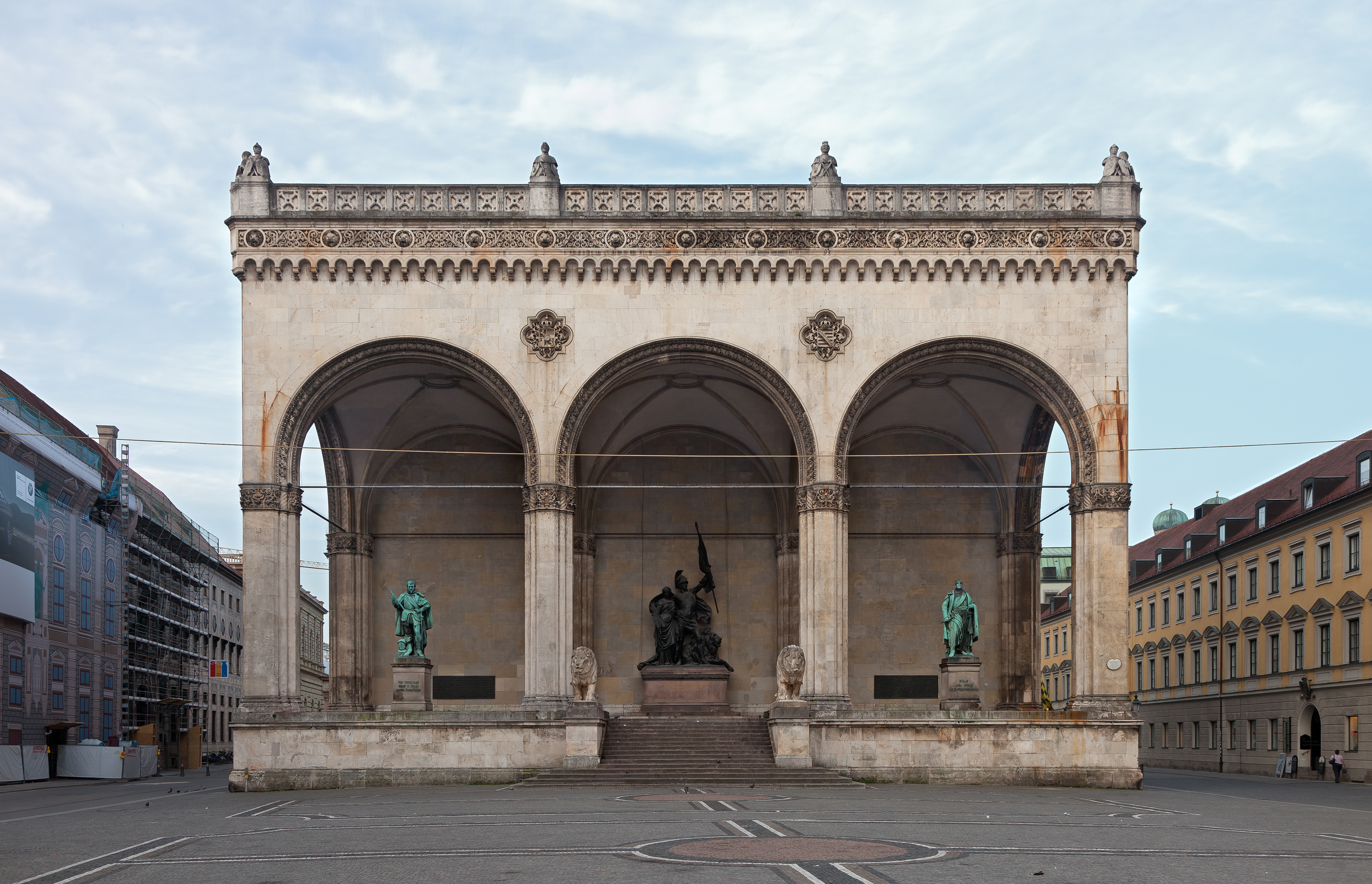
The Feldherrnhalle on the Odeonsplatz

The Feldherrnhalle ("Field Marshals' Hall") is a monumental loggia on the Odeonsplatz in Munich, Germany. Modelled after the Loggia dei Lanzi in Florence, it was commissioned in 1841 by King Ludwig I of Bavaria to honour the tradition of the Bavarian Army.

In 1923, it was the site of the brief battle that ended Hitler's Beer Hall Putsch. During the Nazi era, it served as a monument commemorating the deaths of the 15 Nazis and one bystander killed during the revolt.

== Structure ==
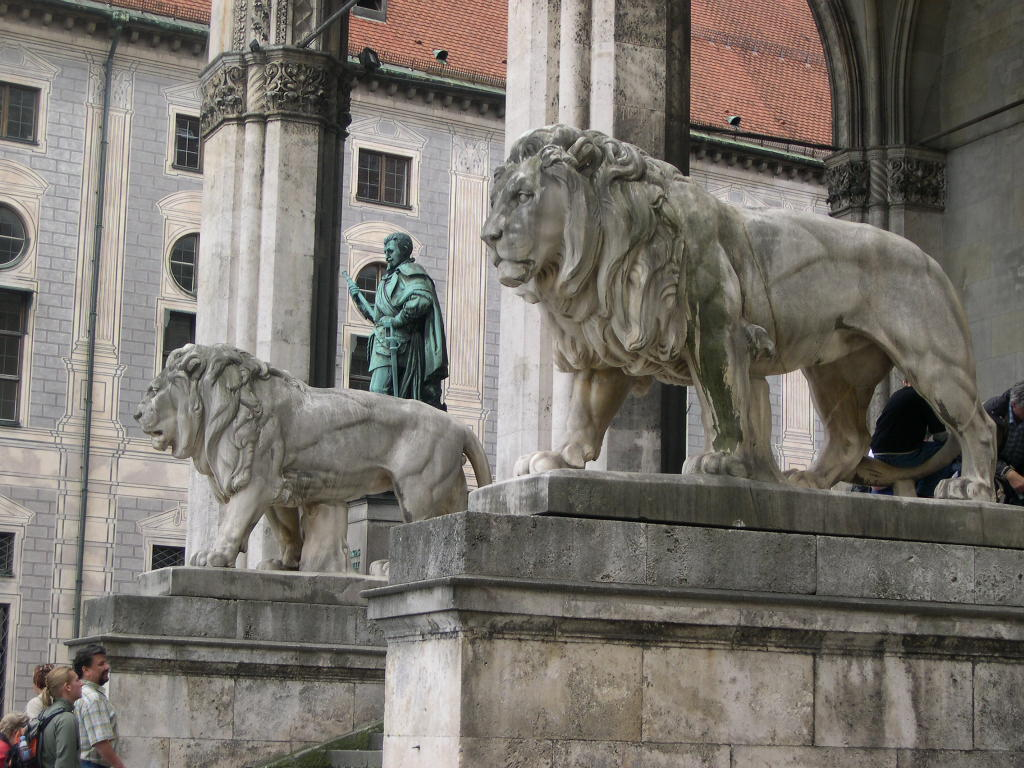
Lions at the Feldherrnhalle by Wilhelm von Rümann

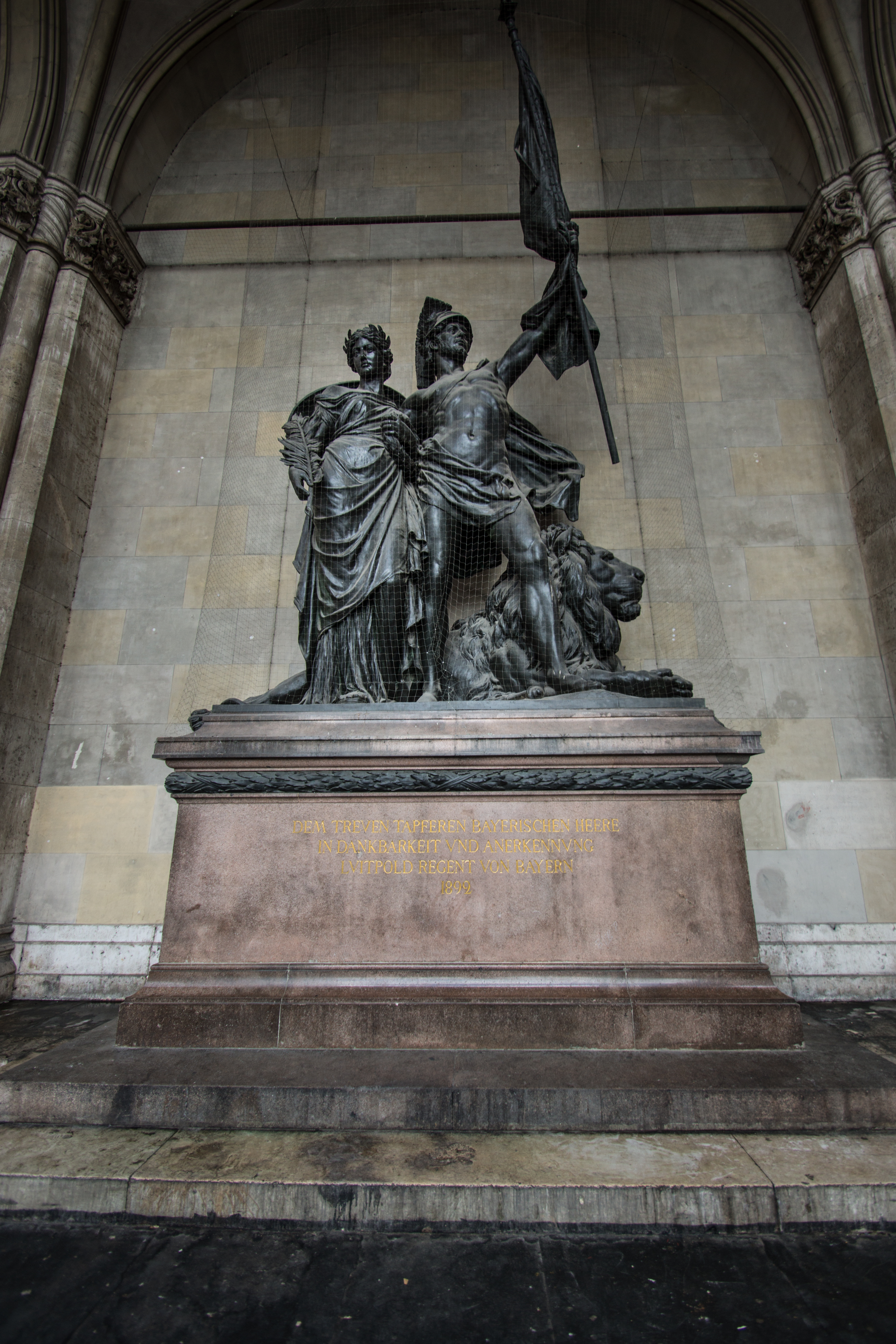
Statue commemorating the Franco-Prussian war inside the Feldherrnhalle

The Feldherrnhalle was built between 1841 and 1844 at the southern end of Munich's Ludwigstrasse next to the Palais Preysing and southwest of the Hofgarten. Previously, the Gothic Schwabinger Tor (gate) occupied that place. Friedrich von Gärtner built the Feldherrnhalle at the behest of King Ludwig I of Bavaria after the example of the Loggia dei Lanzi in Florence.

The Feldherrnhalle was a symbol of the honours of the Bavarian Army, represented by statues of two military leaders Johann Tilly and Karl Philipp von Wrede. The first led Bavarians in the Thirty Years War; the second led the fight against Napoleon. The statues were created by Ludwig Schwanthaler.

Right from the start, some Munich folk used to (and still do) ridicule the two persons honoured in the "Bayerische Feldherrnhalle" (lit. 'Bavarian Hall of Field Commanders / Field Marshals') in reference to the descendance of Tilly and the military strategic capabilities of Wrede: "The one / first was" indeed "never anything like a Bavarian and the second / other" imputedly "never anything like a Feldherr". It is a citation from Lion Feuchtwanger's novel Erfolg.

A sculptural group by Ferdinand von Miller was added to the centre of the monument in 1892, after the Franco-Prussian War, representing the victory over the French and the unification of Germany. The lions are a work of Wilhelm von Rümann, added in 1906 in imitation of the Medici lions of the Loggia dei Lanzi.

== Site of the Beer Hall Putsch ==
The Feldherrnhalle was the scene of a confrontation on Friday morning, 9 November 1923, between the Bavarian State Police and the followers of Adolf Hitler in which the Nazi Party attempted to storm the Bavarian Defense Ministry. This was the culmination of the Nazis' failed coup attempt to take over the Bavarian State, commonly referred to as the Beer Hall Putsch. In the ensuing gun battle, four policemen and 15 putschists were killed. Many more were wounded, including Hermann Göring. This incident was the beginning of Göring’s addiction to opiates. As a result of the failure of the so-called Beer Hall Putsch, Hitler was arrested and sentenced to a prison term.

== Nazi memorial ==
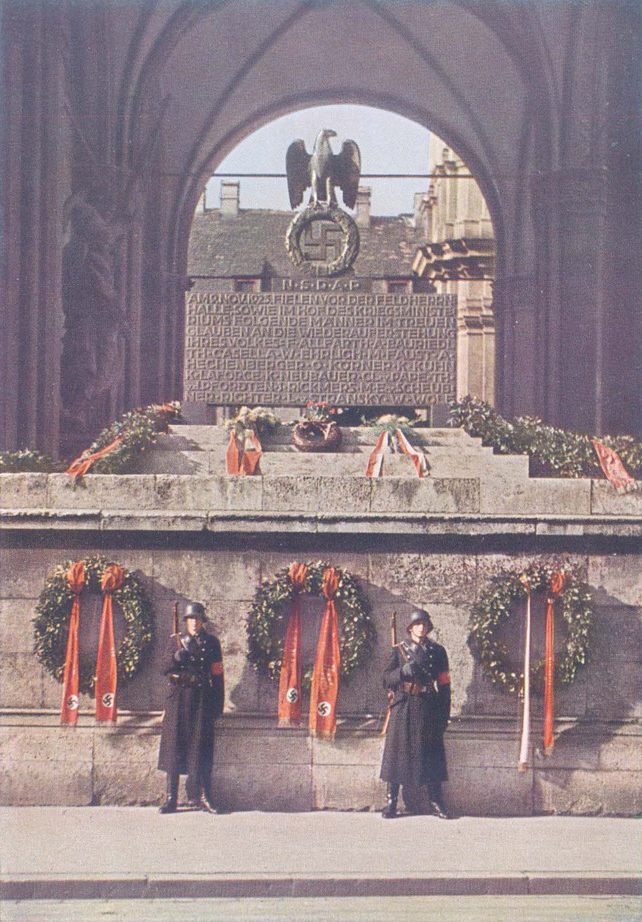
Mahnmal der Bewegung as in 1933, installed at the eastern end of the Feldherrnhalle

After the Nazis took power in 1933, Hitler turned the Feldherrnhalle into a memorial to the Nazis killed during the failed putsch. A memorial to the fallen SA men was put up on its east side, opposite the location of the shootings. This monument, called the Mahnmal der Bewegung was created to a design by Paul Ludwig Troost. It was a rectangular structure listing the names of the martyrs. This was under perpetual ceremonial guard by the SS. The square in front of the Feldherrnhalle (the Odeonsplatz) was used for SS parades and commemorative rallies. During some of these events the sixteen dead were each commemorated by a temporary pillar placed in the Feldherrnhalle topped by a flame. New SS recruits took their oath of loyalty to Hitler in front of the memorial. Passers-by were expected to hail the site with the Nazi salute.

Consequently, some people tried to avoid this. The structure's back side was (and still is) occupied by a Rococo palace, the Palais Preysing, in front of which runs a lane, the Viscardigasse. This little detour helped to bypass the hall, subsequently earning it the nickname "Drückebergergasse" (lit. 'shirker's lane').

One of the most prestigious decorations of the Nazi Party, the Blood Order medal, featured a relief of the entrance to the Feldherrnhalle on its reverse under an angled swastika and sun rays.

== Post-war ==
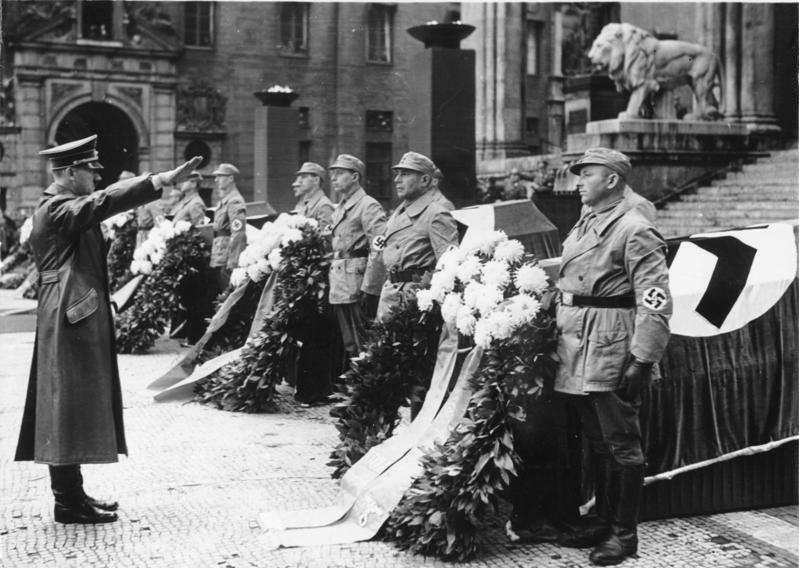
"The solemn act of state in front of the Feldherrnhalle in Munich (11 November 1939) for the seven victims of the criminal bomb attack in Bürgerbräukeller on 8 November 1939" (original caption)

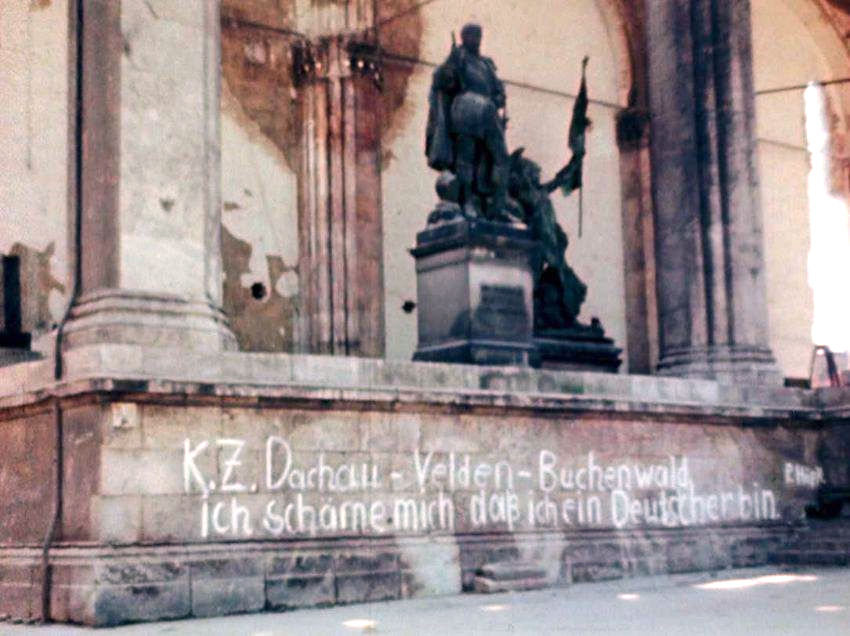
Feldherrnhalle in Munich after American liberation in 1945. American color photography showing inscription being a commentary about Nazi crimes during the Second World War. Inscription in German language: Concentration camps Dachau – Velden (Note: In the town of Velden (Vils) in Bavaria the American 14th Armored Division found a poison gas factory.) – Buchenwald, I am ashamed that I am a German.

At the end of the war the Feldherrnhalle was restored to its pre-Nazi appearance. Local people spontaneously smashed the Mahnmal der Bewegung to pieces on 3 June 1945. In the 1950s a plan to move Bavaria's memorial to the unknown soldier to the Feldherrnhalle was halted on the grounds that it could provide an excuse for neo-Nazis to meet at the site.

On 25 April 1995, Reinhold Elstner, a World War II veteran, committed self-immolation in front of Feldhernhalle to protest against "the ongoing official slander and demonization of the German people and German soldiers". Each year neo-fascist groups from various European countries try to hold a commemorative ceremony for him, which Bavarian authorities try to prevent through state and federal courts.

== See also ==
- Panzerkorps Feldherrnhalle
- Panzergrenadier-Division Feldherrnhalle
- SA-Standarte Feldhernhalle, see de:SA-Standarte „Feldherrnhalle“
- Blood Order medal
