= Universität station (Munich U-Bahn) =

Station of the Munich U-Bahn

Universität
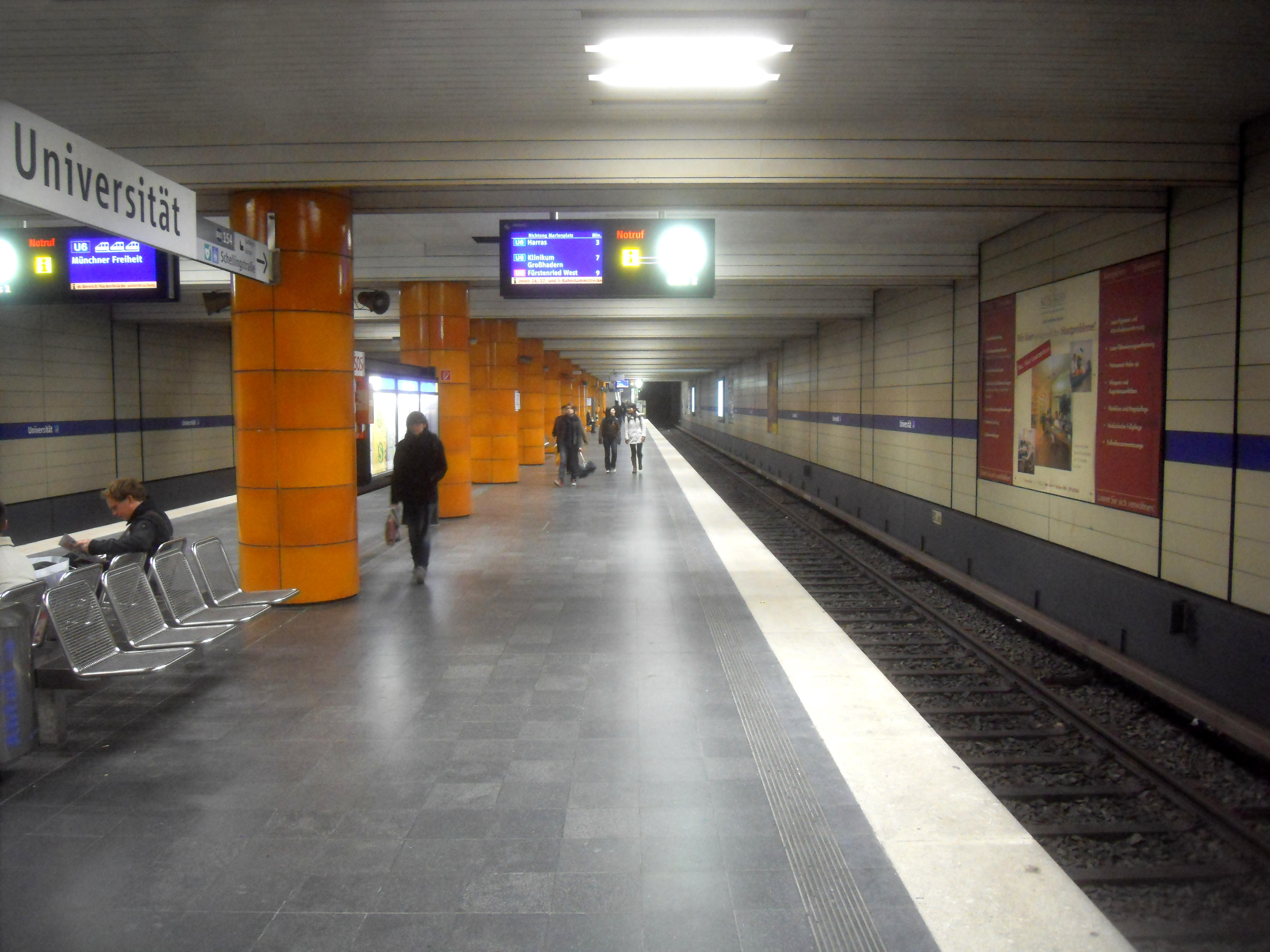

General information
- Location: Munich, Germany
- Coordinates: 48°09′01″N 11°34′53″E
- Platforms: Island platform
- Tracks: 2

Construction
- Structure type: Underground
- Accessible: Yes

Other information
- Fare zone: : M

Services
Preceding station	Munich U-Bahn	Following station
Odeonsplatz towards Fürstenried West	U3	Giselastraße towards Moosach
Odeonsplatz towards Klinikum Großhadern	U6	Giselastraße towards Garching-Forschungszentrum
Location

Universität is a Munich U-Bahn station located in the Munich borough of Maxvorstadt. The lines U3 and U6 both call at the station. It is located directly underneath the north-south-running Ludwigstraße, one of central Munich's main traffic arteries and one of the city's Prachtstraßen. The station's location on the western edge of the Englischer Garten also makes it one of the prime access routes to the city's largest park.

== Name ==
The station's main purpose is to serve LMU Munich whose main buildings are located along Ludwigstraße, Veterinärstraße and Schellingstraße.

The station has two exits: In the south on Schellingstraße and in the north on Ludwigstraße/Akademiestraße. The northern exit is built into the university buildings, allowing direct access to LMU Munich's main building (north-west exit) and the Economics and Law faculties (north-east exit).

== Places nearby ==
- LMU Munich
- Ludwigskirche
- Englischer Garten
