= Giselastraße station =

Station of the Munich U-Bahn

Giselastraße
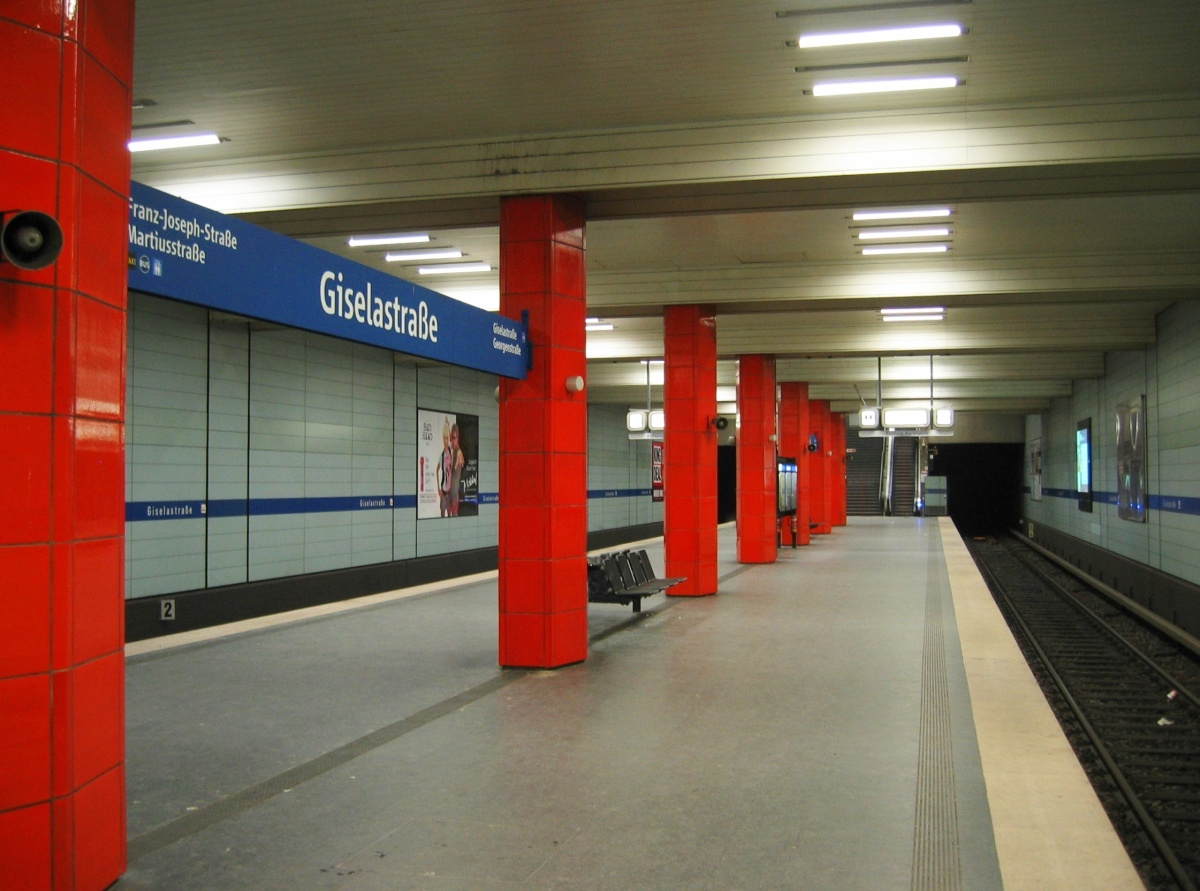

General information
- Location: Schwabing-West; Munich, Germany
- Coordinates: 48°09′23″N 11°35′03″E
- Platforms: Island platform
- Tracks: 2

Construction
- Structure type: Underground
- Accessible: Yes

Other information
- Fare zone: : M

Services
Preceding station	Munich U-Bahn	Following station
Universität towards Fürstenried West	U3	Münchner Freiheit towards Moosach
Universität towards Klinikum Großhadern	U6	Münchner Freiheit towards Garching-Forschungszentrum
Location

Giselastraße is a Munich U-Bahn station located in the Munich borough of Schwabing-West. It services both the U3 and U6 subway lines. The station is located underneath Leopoldstraße, one of Munich's main traffic arteries.

== Name ==
The station is named after the nearby Giselastraße, running from Leopoldstraße eastward towards the Englischer Garten. The stretch of Ludwigstraße between Universität station at Siegestor in the south and Münchner Freiheit in the north as well as its side streets are part of Munich's Schwabing bar scene (although the "real" cliché Schwabing is actually part of the borough of Maxvorstadt, along Türkenstraße and Schellingstraße, east of the university.)

== Places nearby ==
- Siegestor
- Englischer Garten
