= Eduard Mezger =

German painter

Friedrich Eduard Mezger
- Born: 13 February 1807; Pappenheim
- Died: 16 September 1894 (aged 87); Munich
- Education: Munich Academy
- Occupation: Architect
- Buildings: Siegestor (completion work)

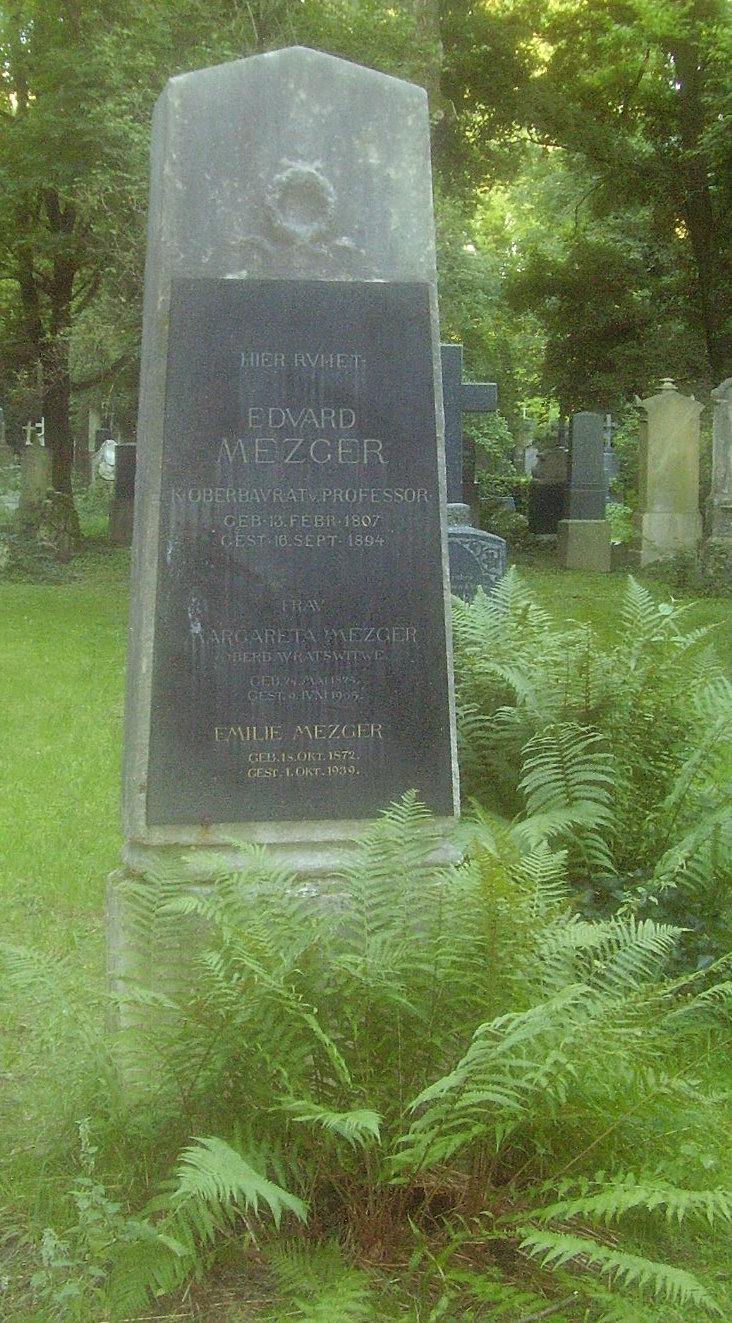
Grave of Eduard Mezger

Friedrich Eduard Mezger (13 February 1807 – 16 September 1894) was a Bavarian architect, painter, professor, and a high civil officer of the royal buildings administration, called Oberbaurat (literally "top architect").

== Biography ==
Mezger was born in Pahuppenheim, son of the government building officer Kaspar Mezger. He studied at the Royal Academy of Fine Arts in Munich, where he was a student of Friedrich von Gärtner from 1825 to 1828, who enabled him to take part in monumental works in Athens. After his return in 1833 he became a professor in civil engineering at the Technical University of Munich, then Oberbaurat in 1846. He contributed to the design of several public and private buildings, amongst them the house of the painter Friedrich Dürck. After Gärtner's death in 1847, he completed the works of the Siegestor in 1850.

He died in Munich in 1894, survived by his wife Magareta and his daughter Emilie. He is buried in the Old Southern Cemetery.

== Published works (selection) ==
- Altgriechische Baukunst (ancient Greek architecture)
- Ornamente aus deutschen Gewächsen zum Gebrauch für Plastik und Malerei (ornaments of German plants for the use in sculpture and painting)
- Die Einwirkung der Gesetze der Konstruktion (the effect of construction rules)

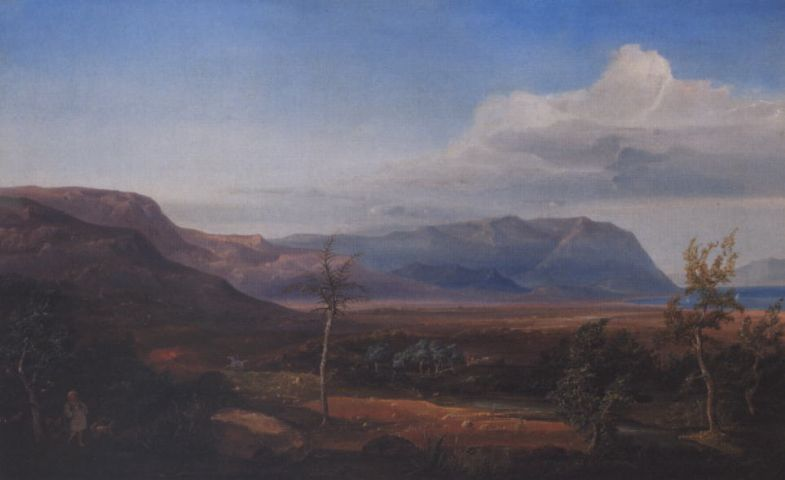
Greek landscape
