= Streetlife Festival =

Streetlife Festival logo

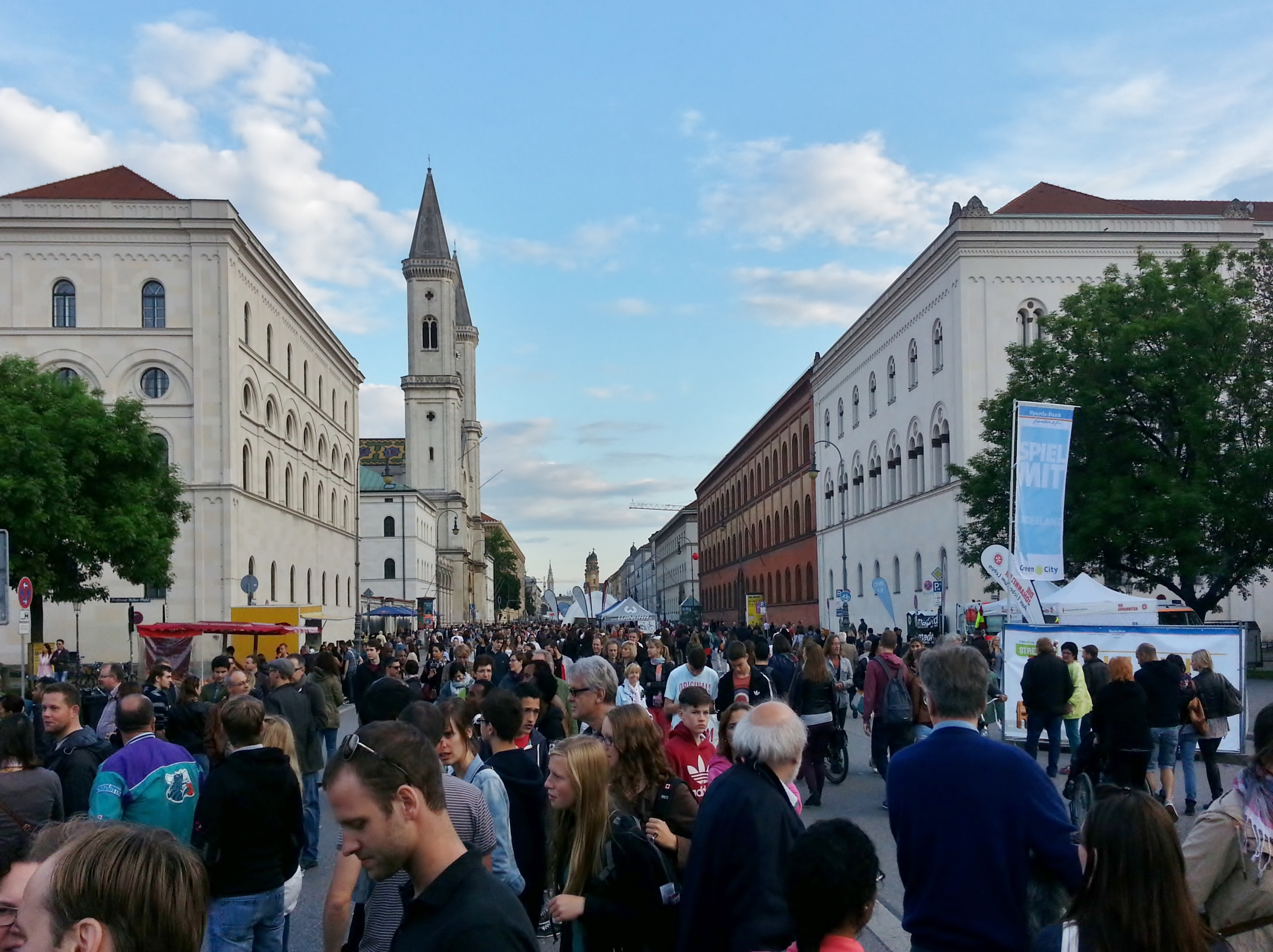
Streetlife Festival 2014

The Streetlife Festival in Munich is a mixture of street festival, environmental exhibition and fair. It takes place every year over two weekends in May / June and September. The venue is Leopoldstraße and the Ludwigstraße - from Georgenstraße to the Odeonsplatz. At the same time, Munich celebrates another traditional street festival, which connects to the Streetlife festival to the north: the Corso Leopold.

On the European Car-Free Days in September 2000, the first Streetlife Festival was held, at this time from Königsplatz to Odeonsplatz. The festival is held in its current location since 2002. In 2003, a second festival weekend was implemented around the May / June time frame. In 2012, more than 500,000 people attended the two Streetlife Festivals.

The aim of the festival is to provide information on sustainable mobility. In which this includes alternative uses of public space, particularly of road space, are introduced and practiced. Clubs, associations, companies, restaurants and citizens have the opportunity to temporarily transform the otherwise heavy traffic areas. Streetlife wants the participants to be active and present their ideas to a wide audience. Motto: Life in the city that is not dictated by traffic.

In 2008, the child and youth newspaper Sprachrohr published for the first time a festival newspaper.

It is organized by the Munich environmental protection organization Green City e.V., which organizes the festival in cooperation with the City of Munich’s Department of Health and Environment. The patron is Munich's mayor Dieter Reiter.
