= Siegestor =

Memorial arch in Munich, Germany

Coordinates: 48°09′08″N 11°34′55″E

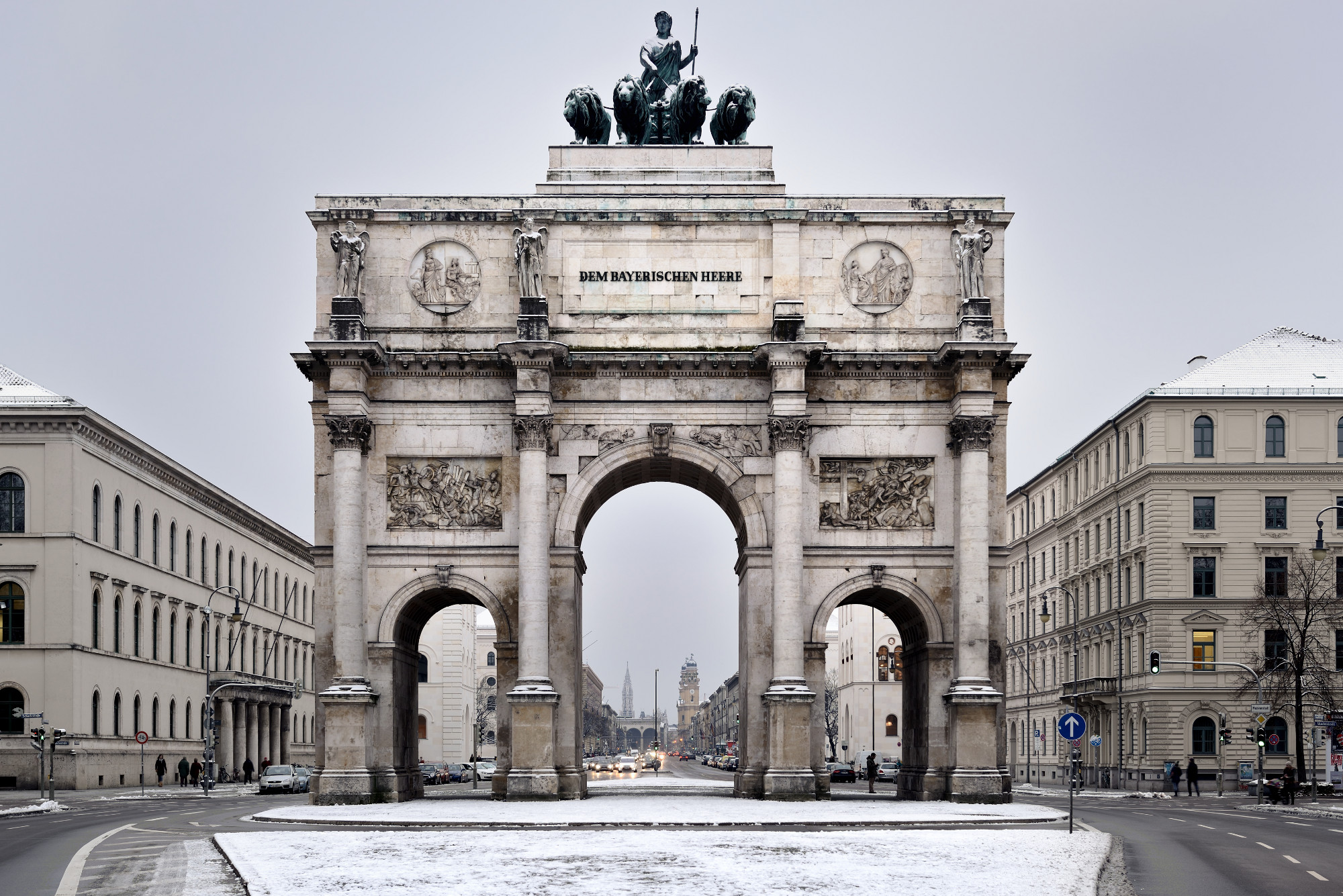
The Siegestor in Munich (2013)

The Siegestor (English: Victory Gate) in Munich is a three-arched memorial arch, crowned with a statue of Bavaria with a lion-quadriga. The monument was originally dedicated to the glory of the Bavarian army. Since its restoration following World War II, it now stands as a reminder to peace.

The Siegestor is 21 meters high, 24 m wide, and 12 m deep. It is located between LMU Munich and the Ohmstraße, where the Ludwigstraße (south) ends and the Leopoldstraße (north) begins. It thus sits at the boundary between the two Munich districts of Maxvorstadt and Schwabing.

== History ==
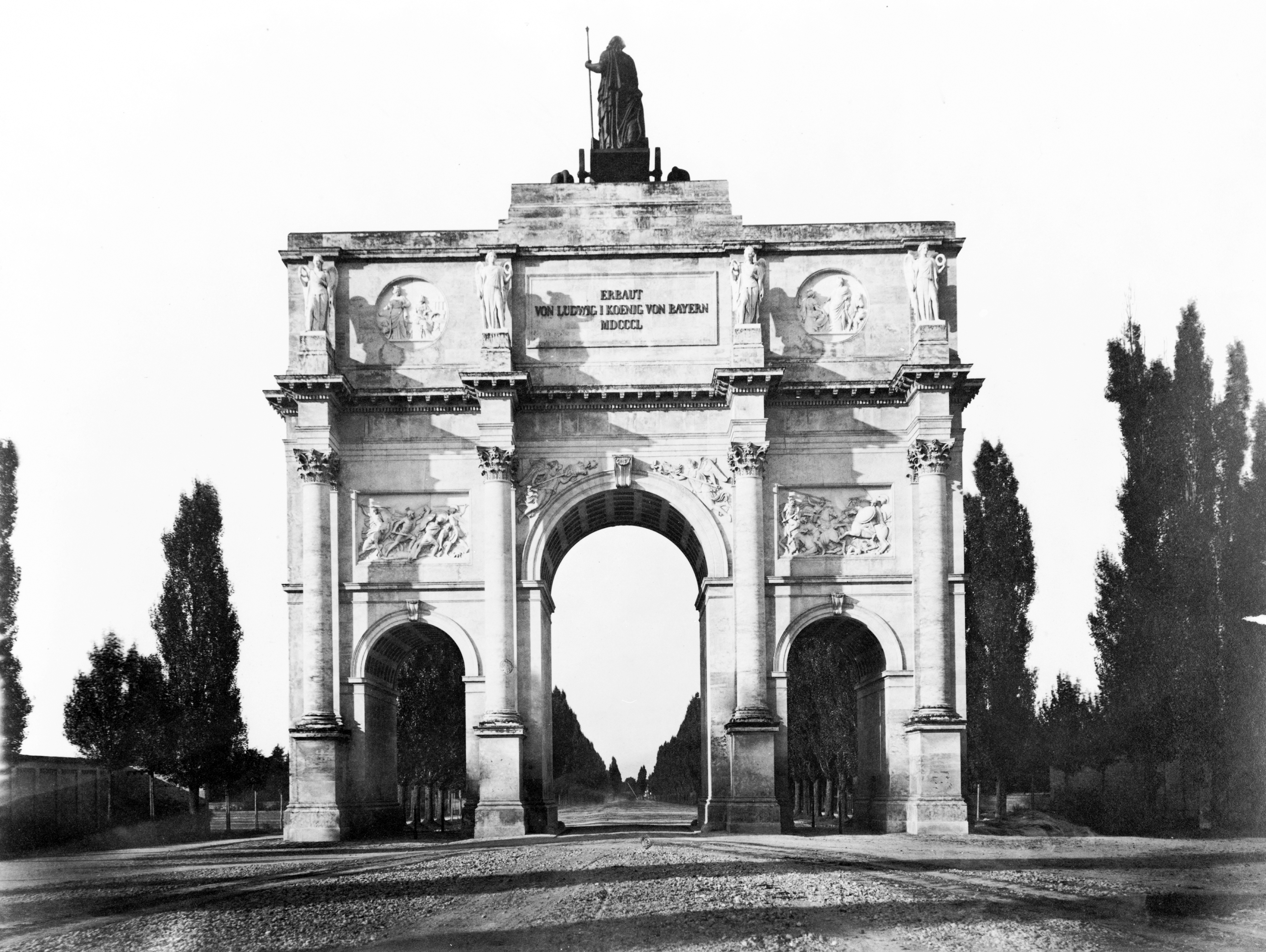
Siegestor, c. 1875

The arch was commissioned by King Ludwig I of Bavaria, designed by Friedrich von Gärtner and completed by Eduard Mezger in 1852. The marble quadriga was sculpted by Johann Martin von Wagner, artistic advisor to Ludwig and a professor at the University of Würzburg. Lions were likely used in the quadriga, instead of horses, because the lion was a heraldic charge of the House of Wittelsbach, the ruling family of the Bavarian monarchy.

The arch was originally dedicated to the glory of the Bavarian army (Dem Bayerischen Heere). Today, the Siegestor is a monument and reminder to peace. After sustaining heavy damage in World War II it was to be demolished in July 1945, however, the arch was reconstructed and restored only partially, in a manner similar to the conservation of the Kaiser-Wilhelm-Gedächtniskirche in Berlin. The new inscription on the back side by Wilhelm Hausenstein reads Dem Sieg geweiht, vom Krieg zerstört, zum Frieden mahnend, "Dedicated to victory, destroyed by war, urging peace". In the early 21st century, the remaining statues were meticulously cleaned and restored.

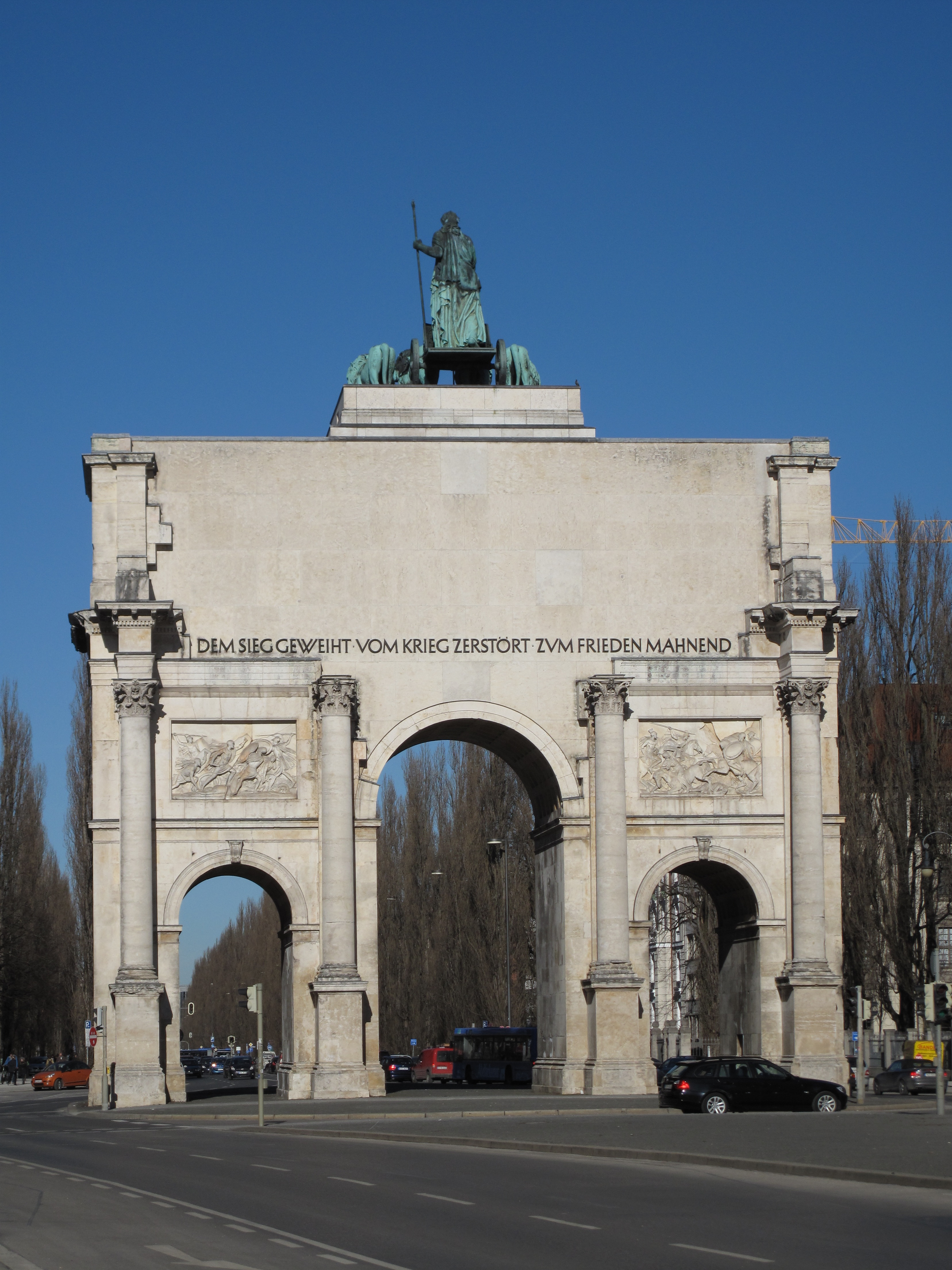
Bare rear of Siegestor, showing inscription "Dedicated to victory, destroyed by war, urging peace"

== In popular culture ==
In the second of the German language film series, Heimat 2 by Edgar Reitz, Evelyne and Ansgar meet and talk by the monument, on which the inscription honoring peace may be seen.

In the ninth season of The Amazing Race, the final Pit Stop for the third leg (a double length leg) was in front of the monument, where the last team to arrive was eliminated from the contest.
