= Bonner Platz station =

Station of the Munich U-Bahn

Coordinates: 48°10′00″N 11°34′43″E

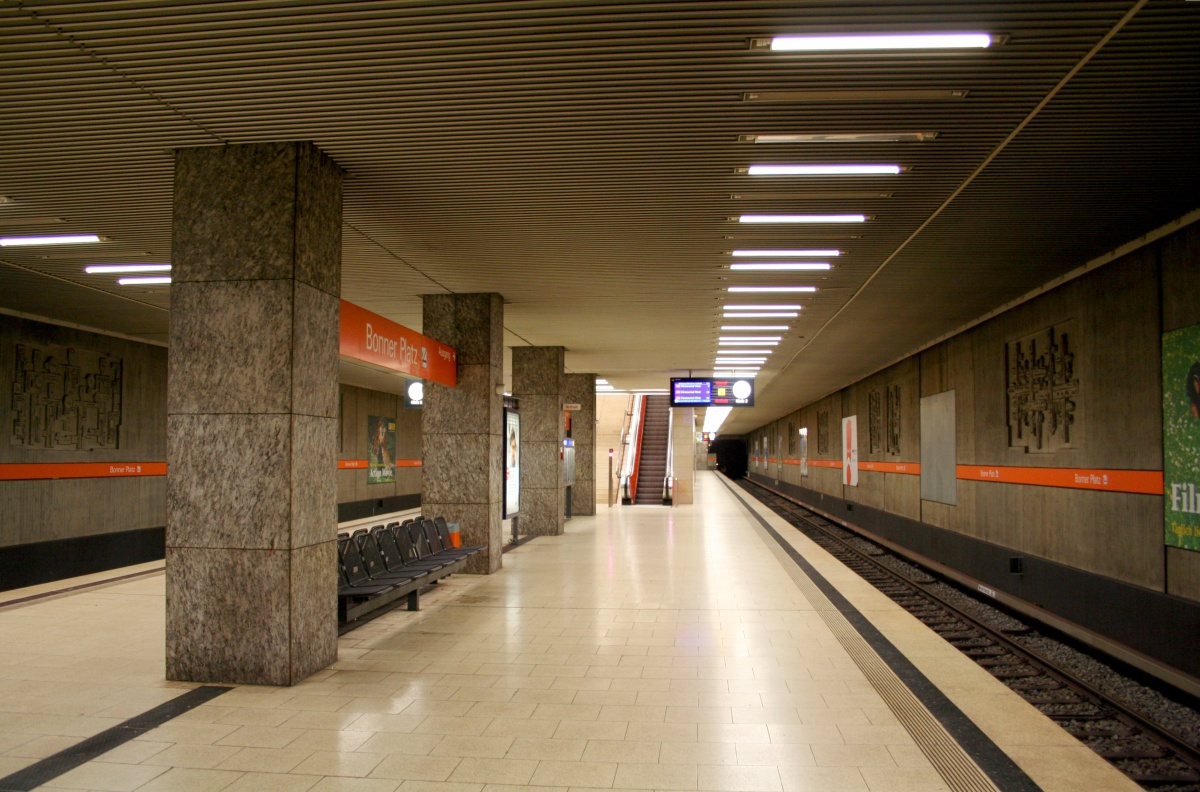
Bonner Platz U-Bahn station

Bonner Platz is an U-Bahn station in Munich on the U3. It opened on 8 May 1972 and is on the Bavarian State Office for Monument Protection's list of monuments, as part of the Olympia-U-Bahn line, due to an art installation on the station's wall.

Preceding station	Munich U-Bahn	Following station
Scheidplatz towards Munich-Moosach	U3	Münchner Freiheit towards Fürstenried West
