= Friedrich Gärtner =

German painter

Friedrich Gärtner (11 January 1824 - 1905) was a German architectural painter.

== Biography ==
He was born in Munich, the son of the architect Friedrich von Gärtner, with whom he went to Athens in 1840. After his return, he studied at the Academy and under Simonsen, of Copenhagen, then in Paris (1846) under Claudius Jacquand; visited Spain and Morocco in 1848, lived again in Paris, in 1851-57, and settled in Munich, where two of his paintings, “Interior of a Moorish House” and “Court of a Monastery by Moonlight” (1846), are in the New Pinakothek.

== See also ==
- List of German painters
