= Johann Martin von Wagner =

German painter, sculptor and art collector

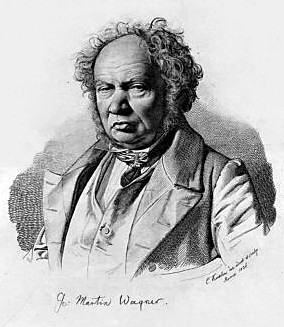
Portrait of Johann Martin von Wagner (by Johann Martin Küchler, 1836)

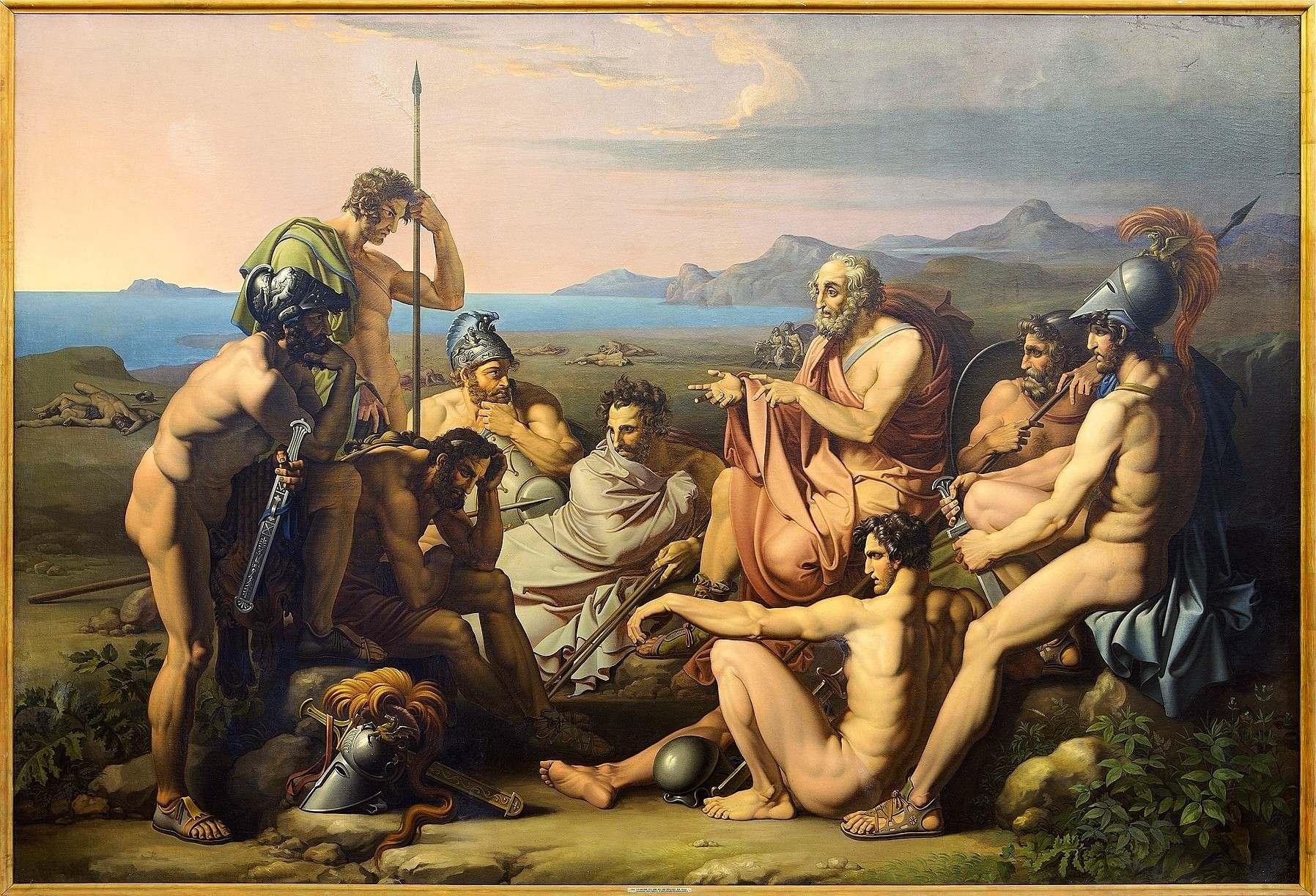
The Council of the Greeks before Troy, 1807

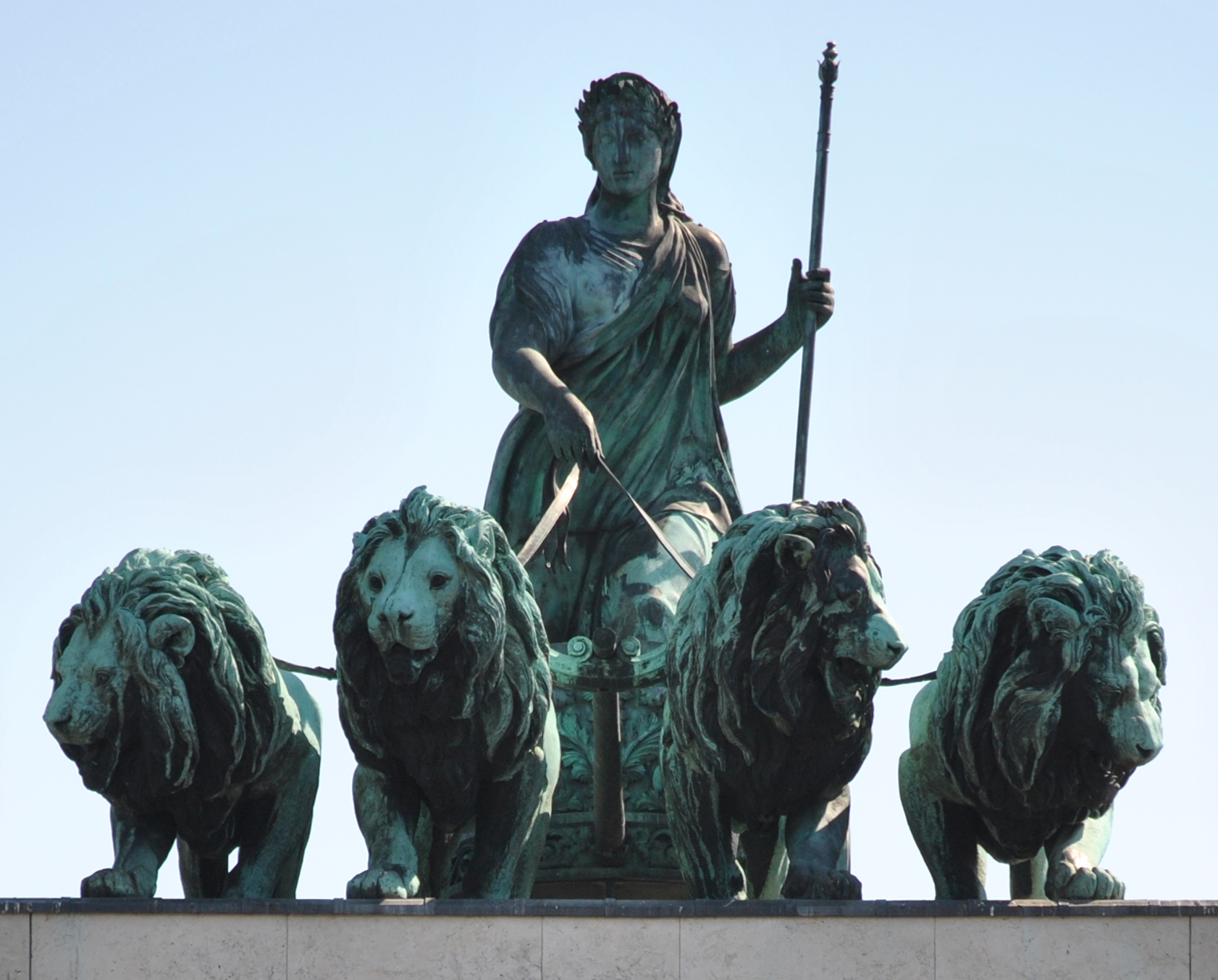
Quadriga on the Siegestor in Munich. The Bavaria (female personification of the Bavarian homeland) was designed by Wagner.

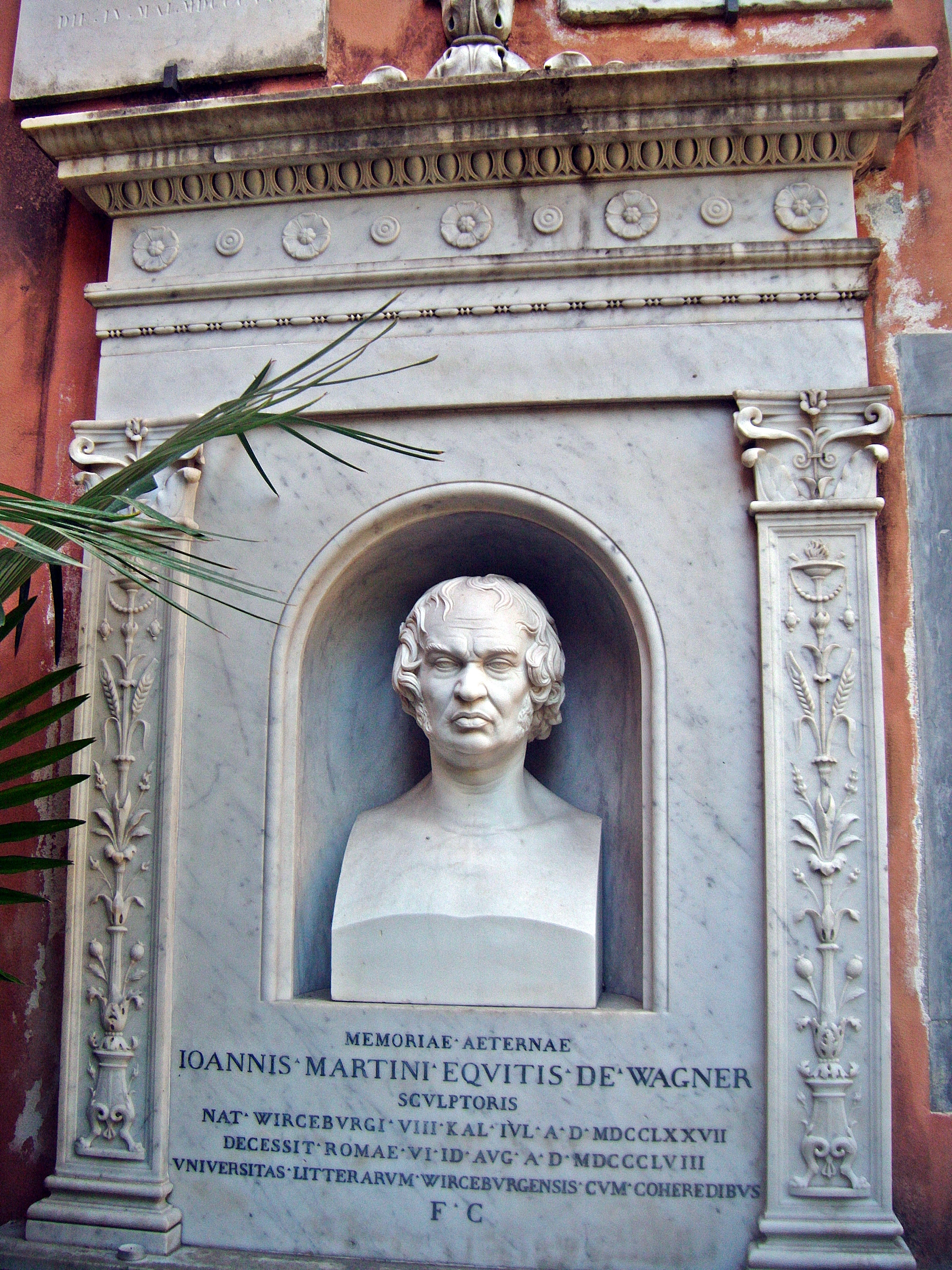
Wagners Tombstone on the Teutonic Cemetery in Rome

Johann Martin von Wagner (born as Johann Martin Wagner; 24 June 1777 – 8 August 1858) was a German painter, sculptor and art collector. Through the donation of his extensive art collection the Martin von Wagner Museum of the University of Würzburg, named after him, became one of the largest university museums in Europe.

== Biography ==
Johann Martin Wagner was born in Würzburg in 1777 as the son of the court sculptor Johann Peter Wagner. After attending grammar school, he became a student with his father at the age of 19. Between 1797 and 1802 he studied painting in Vienna and Paris. In 1802 he received a prize for Aeneas asks Venus for the way to Carthage. In 1803 he took part in a competition of the Weimar friends of art (to which Johann Wolfgang von Goethe also belonged). The theme was Ulysses appeases Polyphemus through wine. Wagner won the prize of 60 ducats and thanks to Goethe's intercession he was appointed professor of drawing arts at the University of Würzburg. He was also offered a two-year study visit in Italy.

In Rome, Wagner was first employed as a drawing teacher in the house of Wilhelm von Humboldt, then Prussian envoy to Italy. Instead of two, Wagner stayed four years and returned to Italy several times during his life. On the return journey from his first stay in Italy, he met the Bavarian Crown Prince Ludwig in Innsbruck. Two years later became his art agent and art advisor. In this function he travelled to Italy again. Wagner worked for Ludwig for almost 40 years. Among other things he advised him on the establishment of the Munich Glyptothek and arranged the purchase of the Barberini Faun and the gable figures from the Temple of Aphaea at Aegina. In 1823 the king appointed him secretary general of the Munich art academy.

Wagner himself increasingly moved from painting to sculpture, but had less and less time for his own artistic work. Meanwhile Wagner had become such an important advisor to King Ludwig that he ennobled him in 1825 – from then on he was called von Wagner. On behalf of the king he created an extensive relief frieze for the interior of the Walhalla: The Germanic procession from the Caucasus to Central Europe. The frieze is Wagner's largest sculptural work.

From 1831 von Wagner lived in the Villa Malta in Rome. In 1841, the King appointed him Central Gallery Director of the Munich Pinakothek, but Wagner immediately asked for his resignation from this post as he did not want to leave Rome. In 1857 Martin von Wagner was made an honorary citizen of Würzburg for his services to art and science. In December of the same year, he donated his entire art collection to the University of Würzburg. Since 1963, the university collection exhibited in the Würzburg Residenz has therefore been named after Wagner – the Martin von Wagner Museum.

Wagner died in Rome on August 8, 1858 and was buried in the Teutonic Cemetery.

== Selected works ==
- Äneas befragt Venus nach dem Weg nach Karthago (Aeneas asks Venus for the way to Carthage), 1802
- Die Heilige Familie (The Holy Family) and Rückkehr der Frauen vom Grabe Christi (Return of the Women from the Tomb of Christ), oil painting, around 1802
- Der Rat der Griechen vor Troja (The Council of the Greeks before Troy), 1807; commissioned by the Bavarian crown prince Ludwig
- Munich, Glyptothek (architect: Leo von Klenze, 1818): Design of the figural decoration of the southern gable field and the façade niches
- Munich, Marstall (architect: Leo von Klenze, 1822); draft of the façade design
- Walhalla frieze (1837)
- Munich, Siegestor: design of the figurative decoration, around 1840
