= Leopoldstraße =

Street in Munich, Germany

Coordinates: 48.924°N 11.353°E

Leopoldstraße is a street in the Munich districts Maxvorstadt, Schwabing and Milbertshofen. It is a major boulevard, and the main street of the Schwabing district. It is a continuation of Ludwigstraße, the boulevard of King Ludwig I of Bavaria, north of the Siegestor.

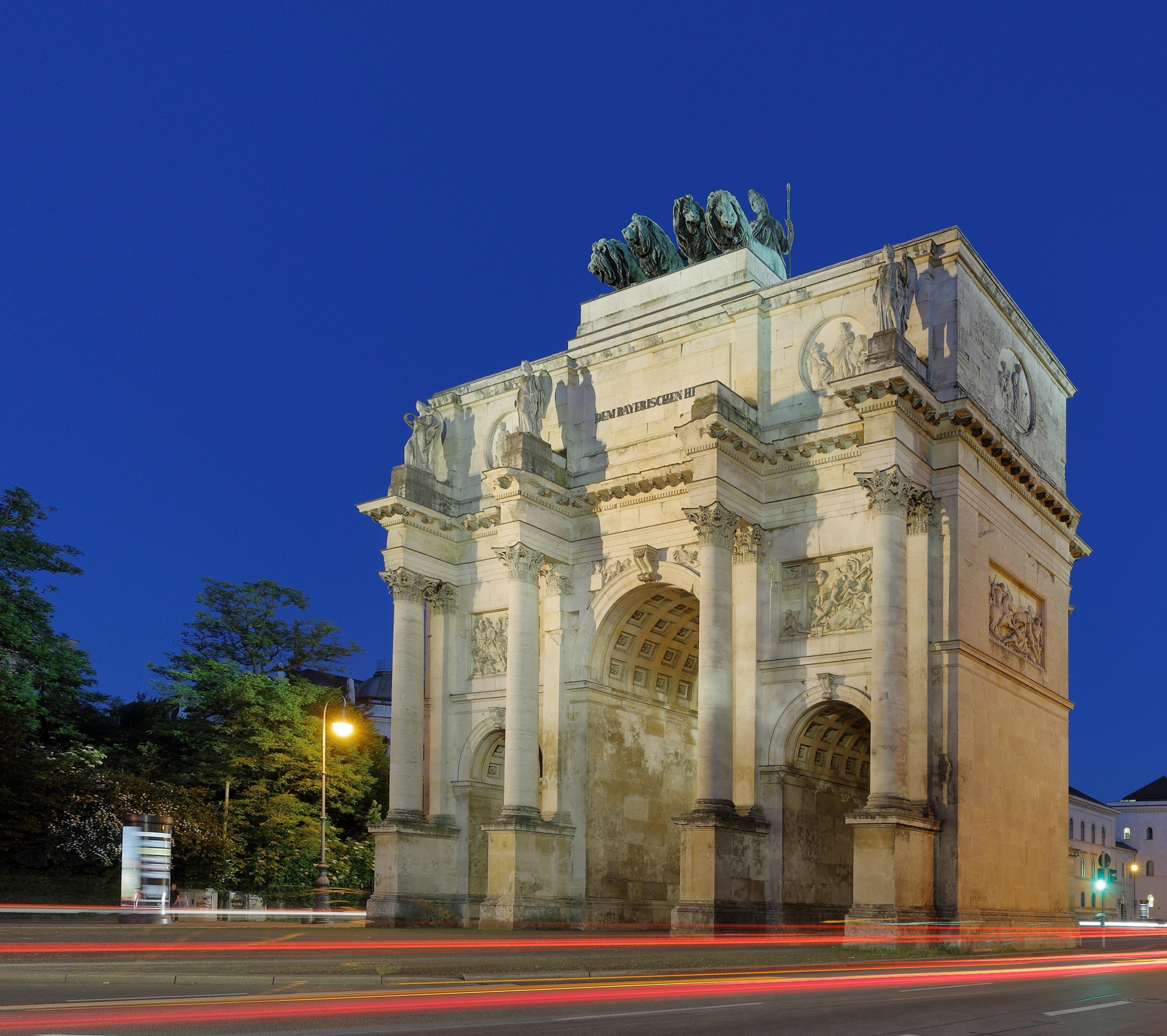
The Siegestor (front), on Leopoldstraße between Munich's Maxvorstadt and Schwabing

== Architecture ==
After the incorporation of Schwabing in 1891, it was named after Prince Leopold of Bavaria, son of Prince Regent Luitpold of Bavaria. Previously the southern part of this road was called Schwabinger Weg (way). From Milbertshofener Straße / Domagkstraße, Leopoldstrasse is named Ingolstädter Straße.

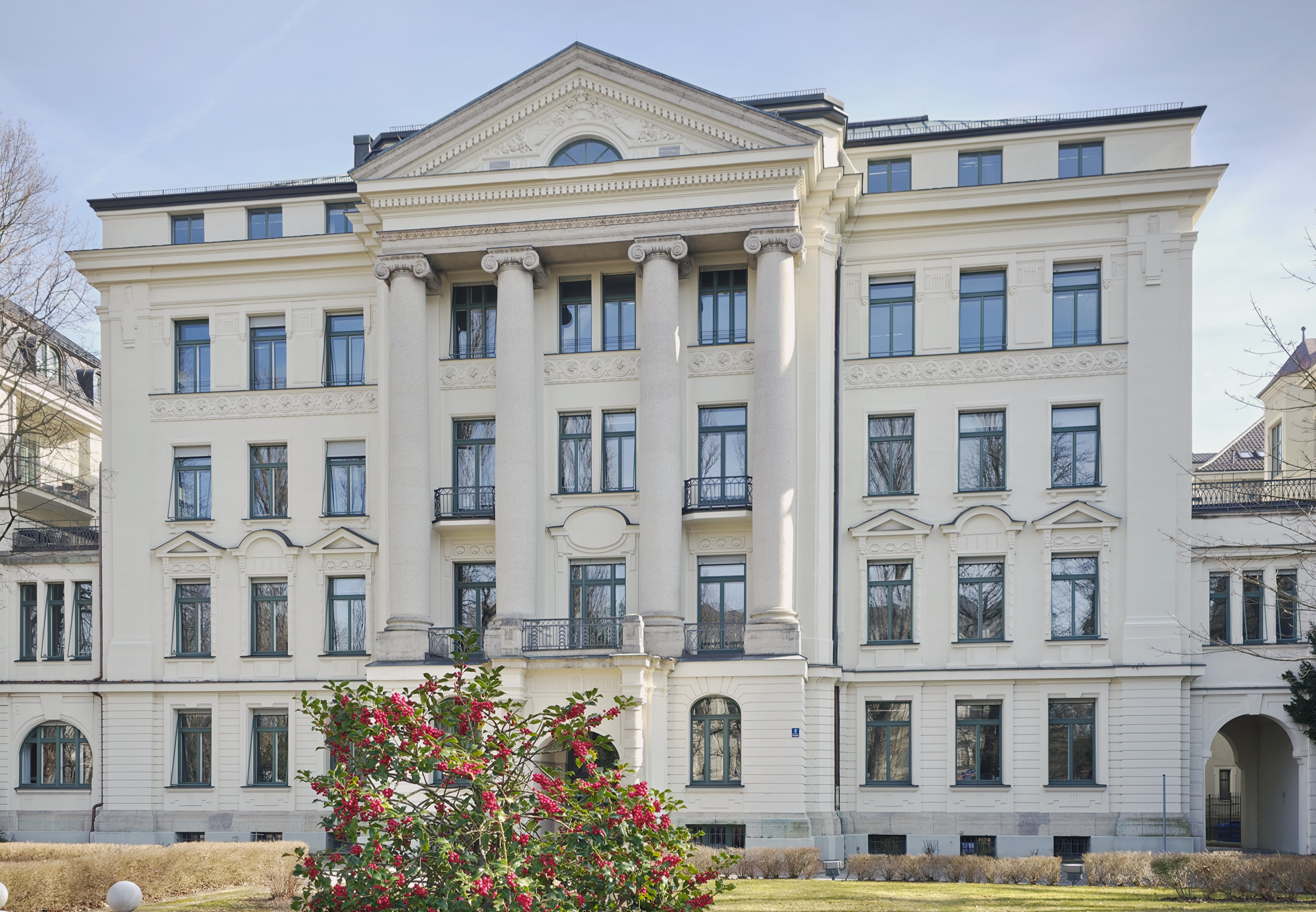
Palatial building from Martin Dülfer (1896), Leopoldstraße 4

Leopoldstraße runs from the Siegestor (Victory Gate) and the Art Academy in the south to the Münchner Freiheit, with the Protestant church 'Erlöserkirche', and then further to the north. The first house on the left side was the villa of Lola Montez, a mistress of Ludwig I. Today it houses the Student Union of LMU Munich. The large sculpture "Walking Man" was created by the artist Jonathan Borofsky.

The street is one of the most important ones in Munich, featuring shops, cinemas, hotels, open air cafés and restaurants and a major parkway. Throughout the year it is a location for various events such as the Munich Marathon and street festivals like the Streetlife Festival, during which Leopoldstraße is partially or completely closed to automobile traffic. After major sporting events the boulevard of Schwabing is occupied by celebrating fans. In the side streets east of Münchner Freiheit, (Occam-, Feilitzsch-, Sieges-, Marktstraße) an amusement quarter with many pubs and bars is located, some with live music.

== Munich subway ==
Below the street are since 1971 the tunnels of Munich subway lines 3 and 6 with the stations Giselastraße and Münchner Freiheit.

== Student riots ==
In 1962, Leopoldstraße was the scene of the Schwabinger Krawalle (Schwabing riots) and from 1995 to 2001 of the annual technoparade Union Move.
