= Münchner Freiheit station =

Station of the Munich U-Bahn

Münchner Freiheit
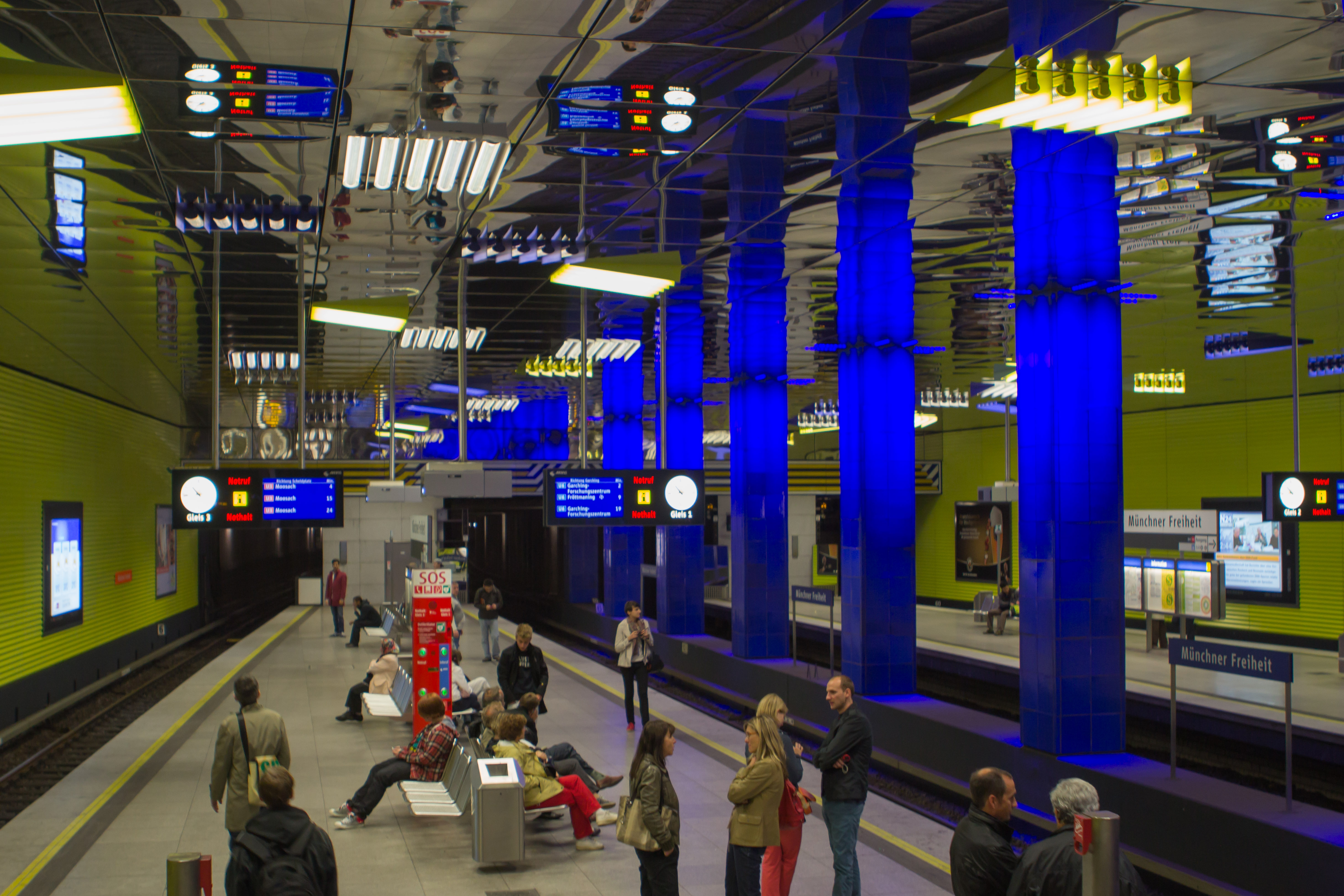

General information
- Location: Schwabing-Freimann; Munich, Germany
- Coordinates: 48°09′41″N 11°35′11″E
- Platforms: 2 island platforms
- Tracks: 4

Construction
- Structure type: Underground
- Accessible: Yes

Other information
- Fare zone: : M

Services
Preceding station	Munich U-Bahn	Following station
Giselastraße towards Fürstenried West	U3	Bonner Platz towards Moosach
Giselastraße towards Klinikum Großhadern	U6	Dietlindenstraße towards Garching-Forschungszentrum
Location

Münchner Freiheit is a Munich U-Bahn interchange station in the Munich borough of Schwabing-Freimann. Here, the U3 and U6 subway lines part, with U3 continuing west towards Scheidplatz and U6 continuing north towards Freimann. The station serves as a major interchange for northern Munich.

Underground, the station consists of two island platforms, each servicing two tracks.

On the surface, a bus and tram terminal is located on the corner of Leopoldstraße and Feilitschstraße. This is the southern terminus of route of the Munich tramway, which opened in 2009 and continues north towards the Parkstadt Schwabing office and residential development.

== Name ==
The station is named after the eponymous square located on the eastern side of Leopoldstraße. Before the renovation in 2009, the name had the old spelling: Münchener Freiheit. The spelling was changed to omit the extra letter 'e' in Münchner.
