= Pappenheim =

- Town
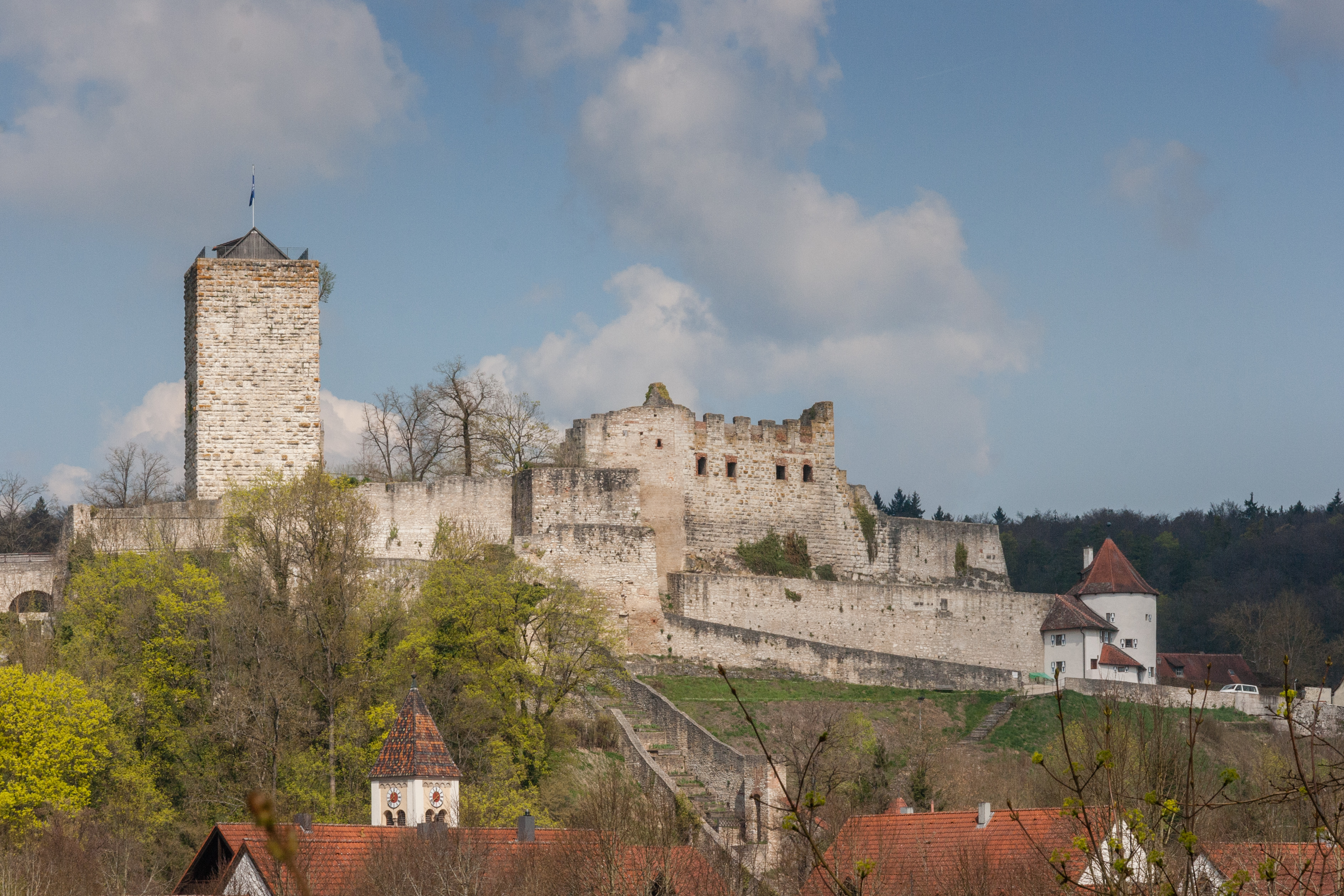
- Pappenheim Castle

- Coat of arms

- Location of Pappenheim within Weißenburg-Gunzenhausen district
- Interactive map of Pappenheim
- Location within Germany Location within Bavaria
- Coordinates: 48°56′5″N 10°58′28″E
- Country: Germany
- State: Bavaria
- Admin. region: Middle Franconia
- District: Weißenburg-Gunzenhausen
- Subdivisions: 9 Ortsteile

Government
  - Mayor (2020–26): Florian Gallus (CSU)

Area
  - Total: 64.32 km^{2} (24.83 sq mi)
- Elevation: 405 m (1,329 ft)

Population (2025-12-31)
  - Total: 3,934
  - Density: 61.16/km^{2} (158.4/sq mi)
- Time zone: UTC+01:00 (CET)
  - Summer (DST): UTC+02:00 (CEST)
- Postal codes: 91788
- Dialling codes: 09143
- Vehicle registration: WUG
- Website: www.pappenheim.de

Pappenheim (German pronunciation: [ˈpapn̩haɪm]) is a town in the Weißenburg-Gunzenhausen district, in Bavaria, Germany. It is situated on the river Altmühl, 11 kilometres (6.8 mi) south of Weißenburg in Bayern.

== History ==
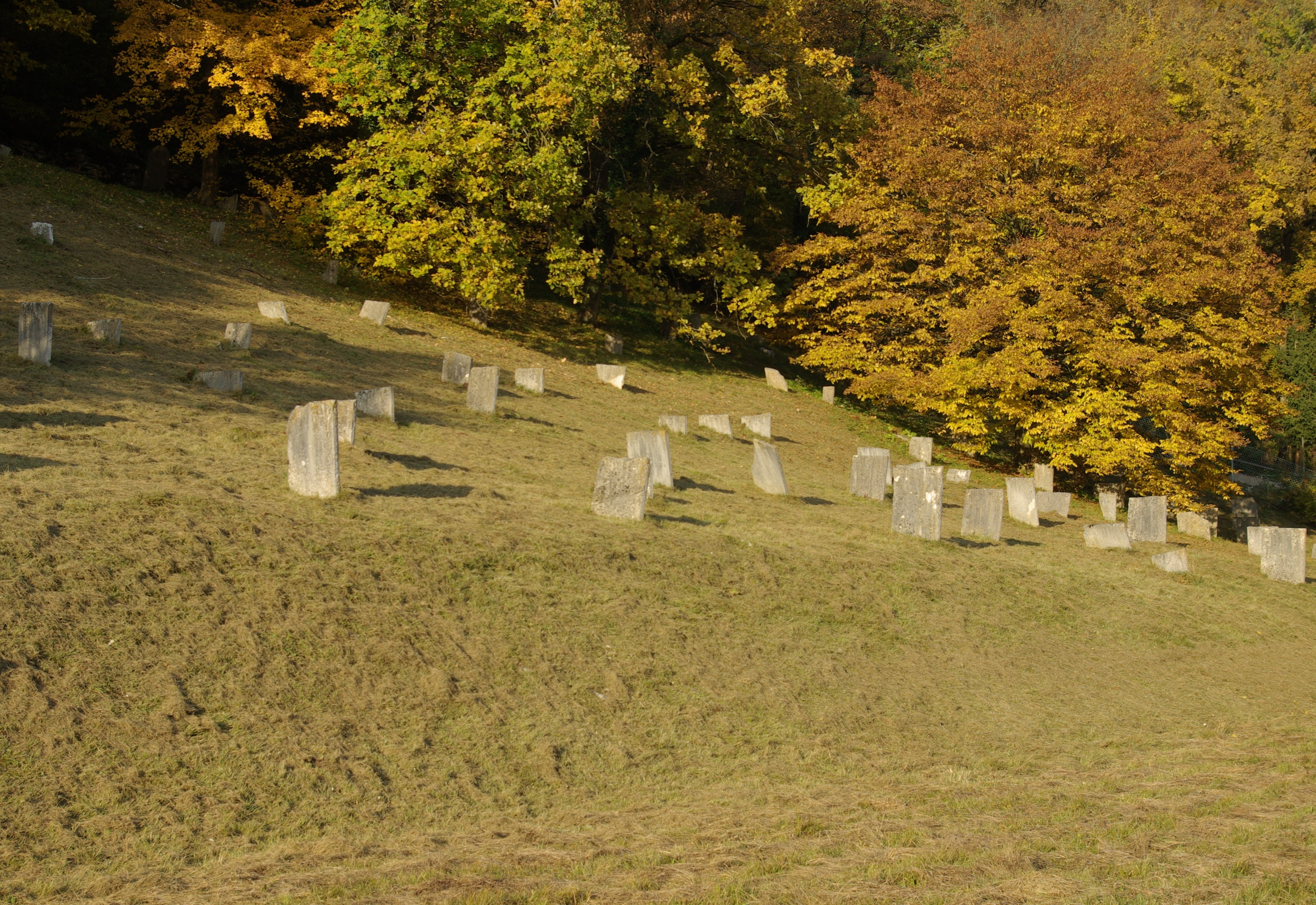
The Jewish cemetery from the 12th century.

Historically, Pappenheim was a statelet within the Holy Roman Empire. It was mediatised to Bavaria in 1806.

Counts of Pappenheim settled at the territory, particularly Gottfried Heinrich Graf zu Pappenheim.

== Sites ==
- Galluskirche
- Neues Schloss (built by Leo von Klenze after the mediatisation of the Pappenheim state; not open to the public)
- Altes Schloss

== Notable people ==
The architect and professor Eduard Mezger (1807–1894) was born in Pappenheim.

Else Pappenheim (1911–2009) and her father Martin Pappenheim (1881–1943), both were famous psychoanalysts.
