= Ludwigskirche, Munich =

Church in Munich, Germany

Ludwigskirche
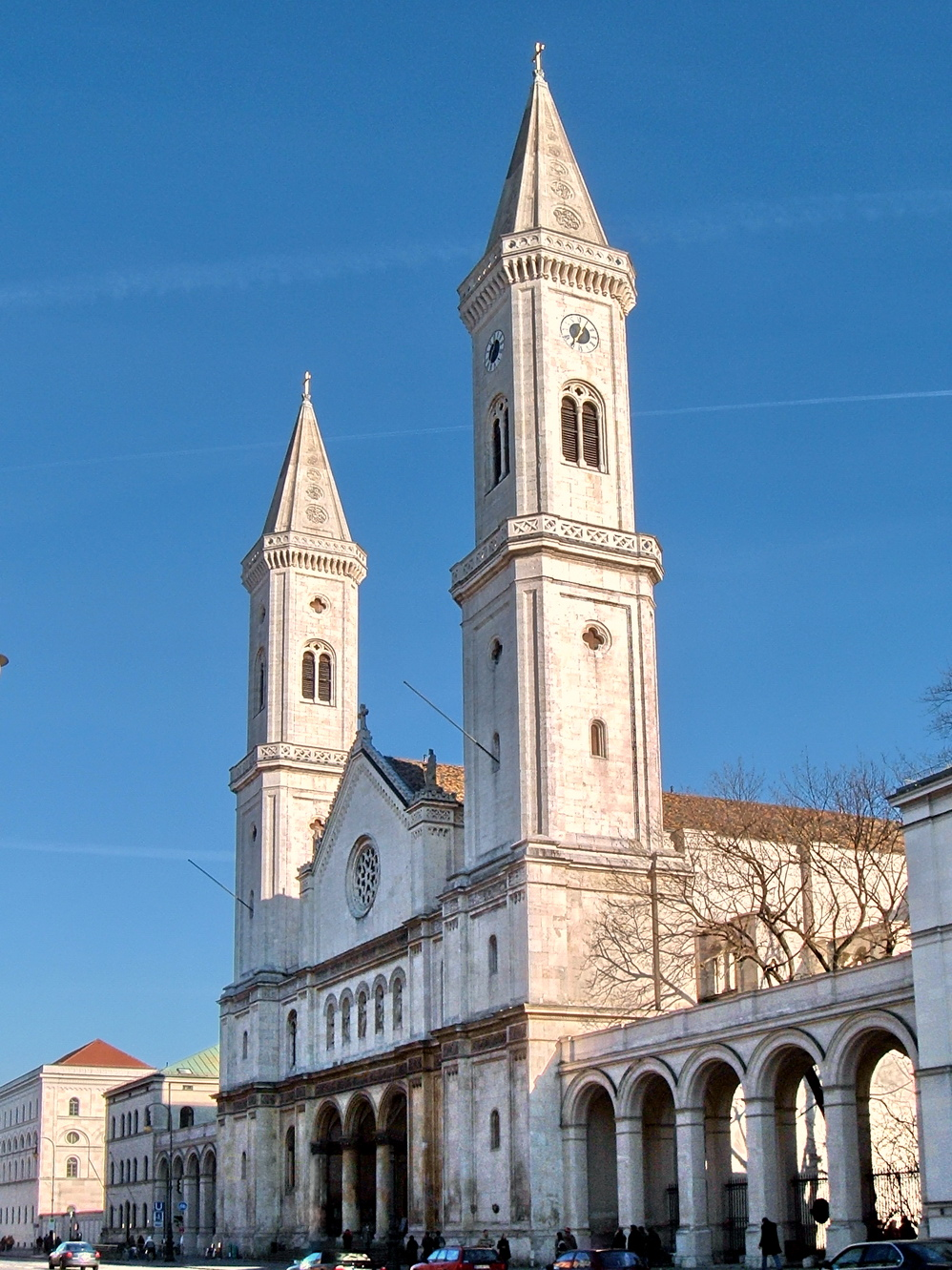
- Ludwigskirche
- Ludwigskirche
- 48°08′56″N 11°34′53″E
- Address: Ludwigstraße 22; Munich, Germany
- Country: Germany
- Denomination: Catholic

Architecture
- Architect: Friedrich von Gärtner
- Style: Neo-Romanesque
- Years built: 1829–1844

The Catholic Parish and University Church of St. Louis, called Ludwigskirche, in Munich is a monumental church in Neo-Romanesque style with the second-largest altar fresco of the world. The building, with its round arches called the Rundbogenstil, strongly influenced other church architecture, train stations and synagogues in both Germany and the United States.

== Architecture ==
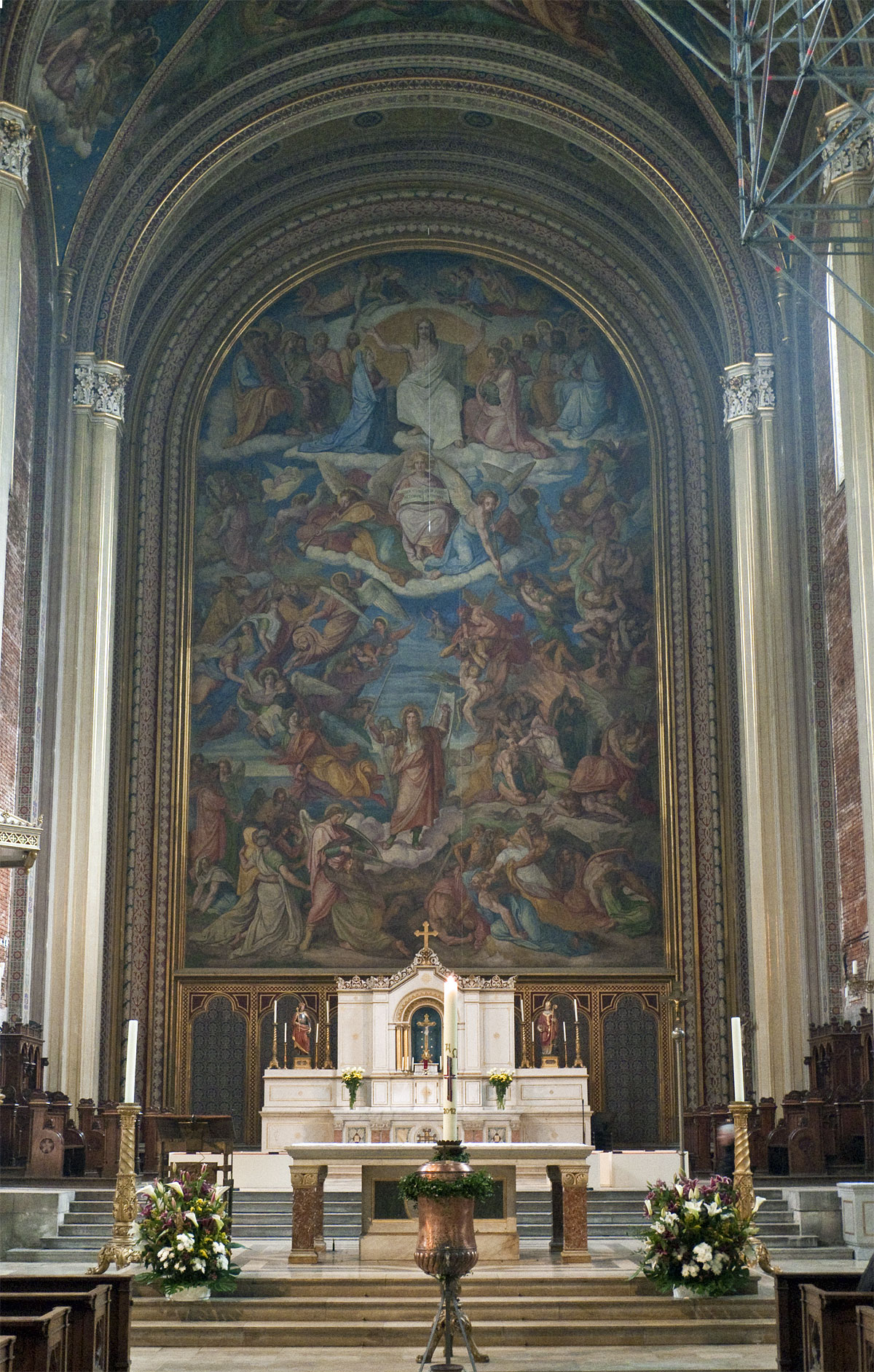
Fresco by Peter von Cornelius

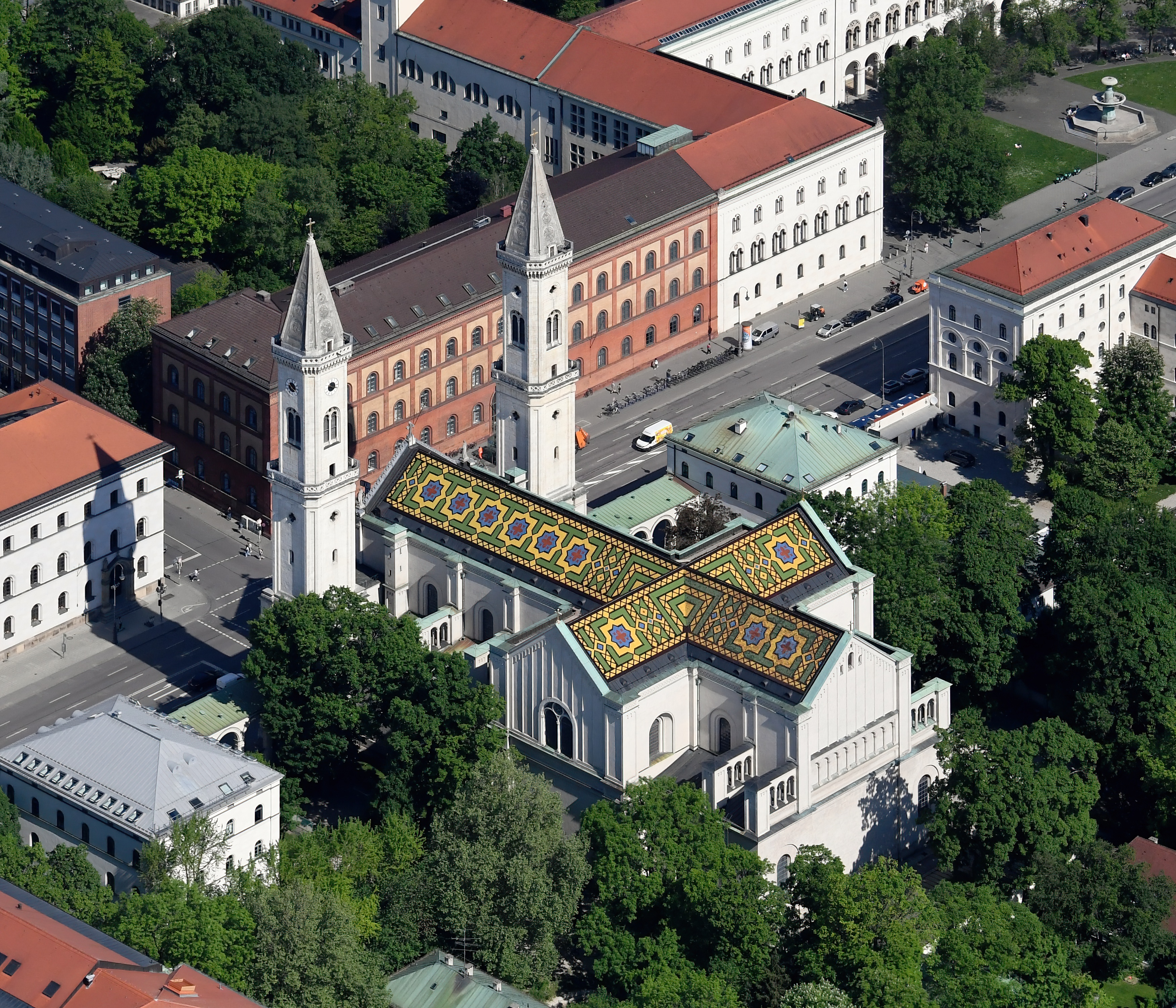
Aerial view of the mosaic roof

The Ludwigskirche is situated in the northern part of the Ludwigstrasse and was built by the architect Friedrich von Gärtner from 1829 onward (completed 1844). The patron was King Ludwig I of Bavaria. The facade with two steeples was constructed as balance to the Theatinerkirche, which stands diagonally opposite. The floor plan shows the church as a model to a three-aisled Byzantine basilica with the basic geometric figure of the cross of tau. The church is 60 m long and 20 m wide. The towers are 71 meters high and each equipped with six bells, which are named after patron saints of the family of King Ludwig. In the years 2007–2009 the church roof was re-covered in the originally planned mosaic decoration.

The frescoes of the church were created by Peter von Cornelius. They are perhaps one of the most important mural works of modern times. The large fresco of the Last Judgment (1836–1840), situated over the high altar, measures 62 ft in height by 38 ft in width. The frescoes of the Creator, the Nativity, and the Crucifixion are also on a large scale. But the work was rejected by the King, and Cornelius left Munich shortly afterward. The sculpture Four Evangelists with Jesus Christ was designed by Ludwig von Schwanthaler.

The church was the model for many other churches, such as the Altlerchenfelder Pfarrkirche in Vienna, and Richard Upjohn's Congregational Church of the Pilgrims (1844–1846), in Brooklyn, New York, the first of the Rundbogenstil in North America. This was followed by St. George's Episcopal Church in New York City by Charles Bresch, and the Bowdoin College Chapel in Brunswick, Maine. In Minnesota the church was the blueprint for the Church of the Assumption (1874) in Saint Paul and the original abbey church of Saint John's Abbey (1868) in Collegeville.

== Burial place ==
In 1997 the remains of Romano Guardini were moved to the Sankt Ludwig Kirche, the University church, where he had preached from 1948 till 1963.
