= Friedrich von Gärtner =

German architect (1791–1847)

- Born: Friedrich von Gärtner; 10 December 1791
- Died: 21 April 1847 (aged 55)

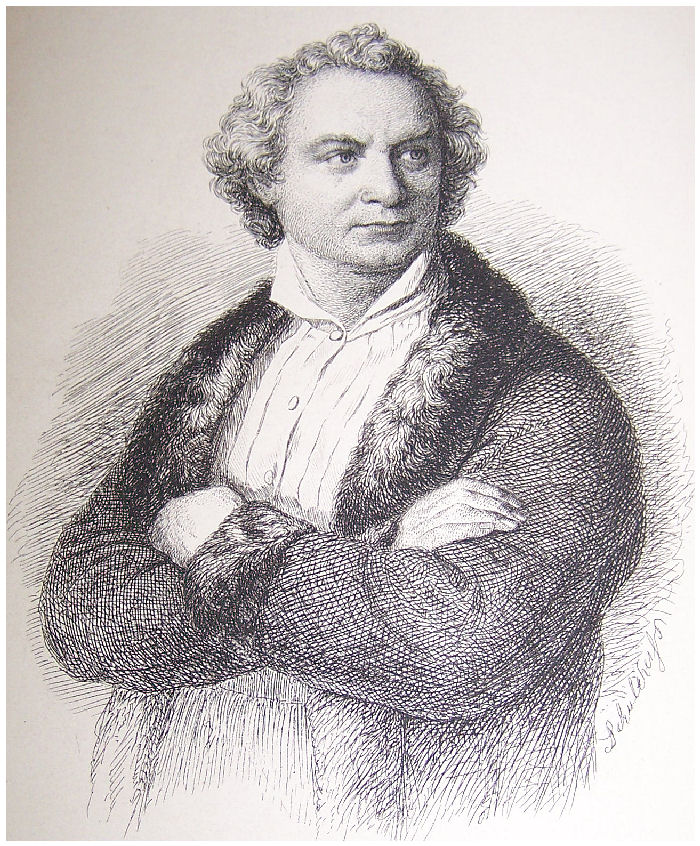
Friedrich von Gärtner

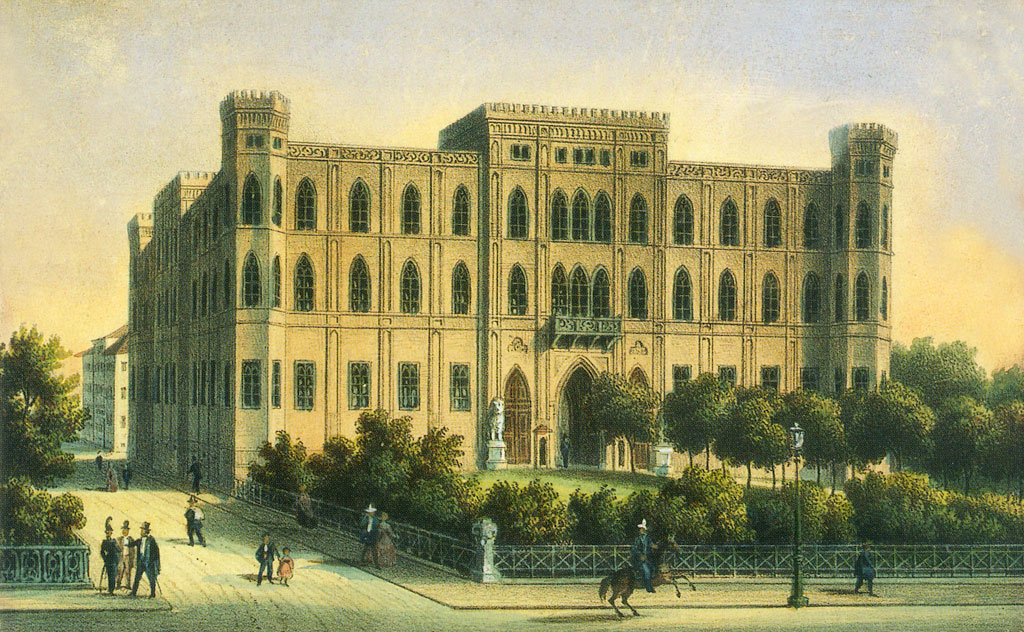
The Wittelsbacher Palace

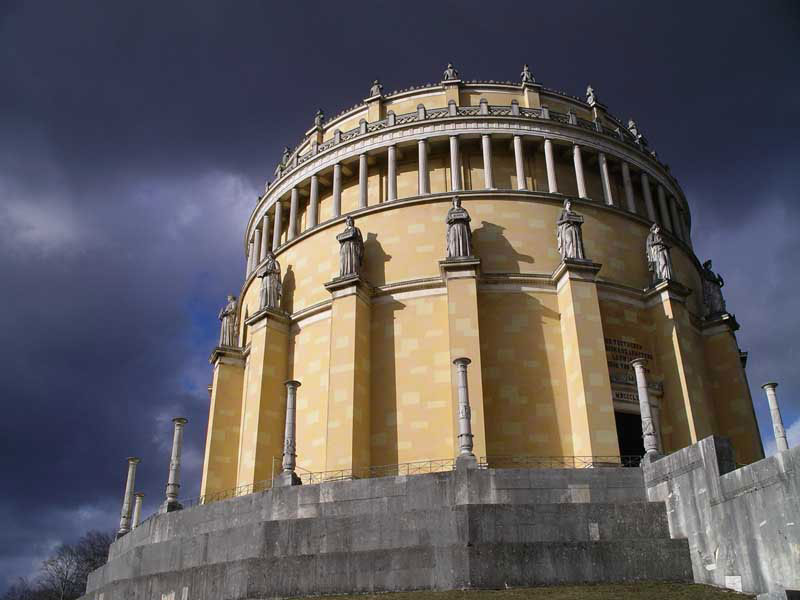
Befreiungshalle

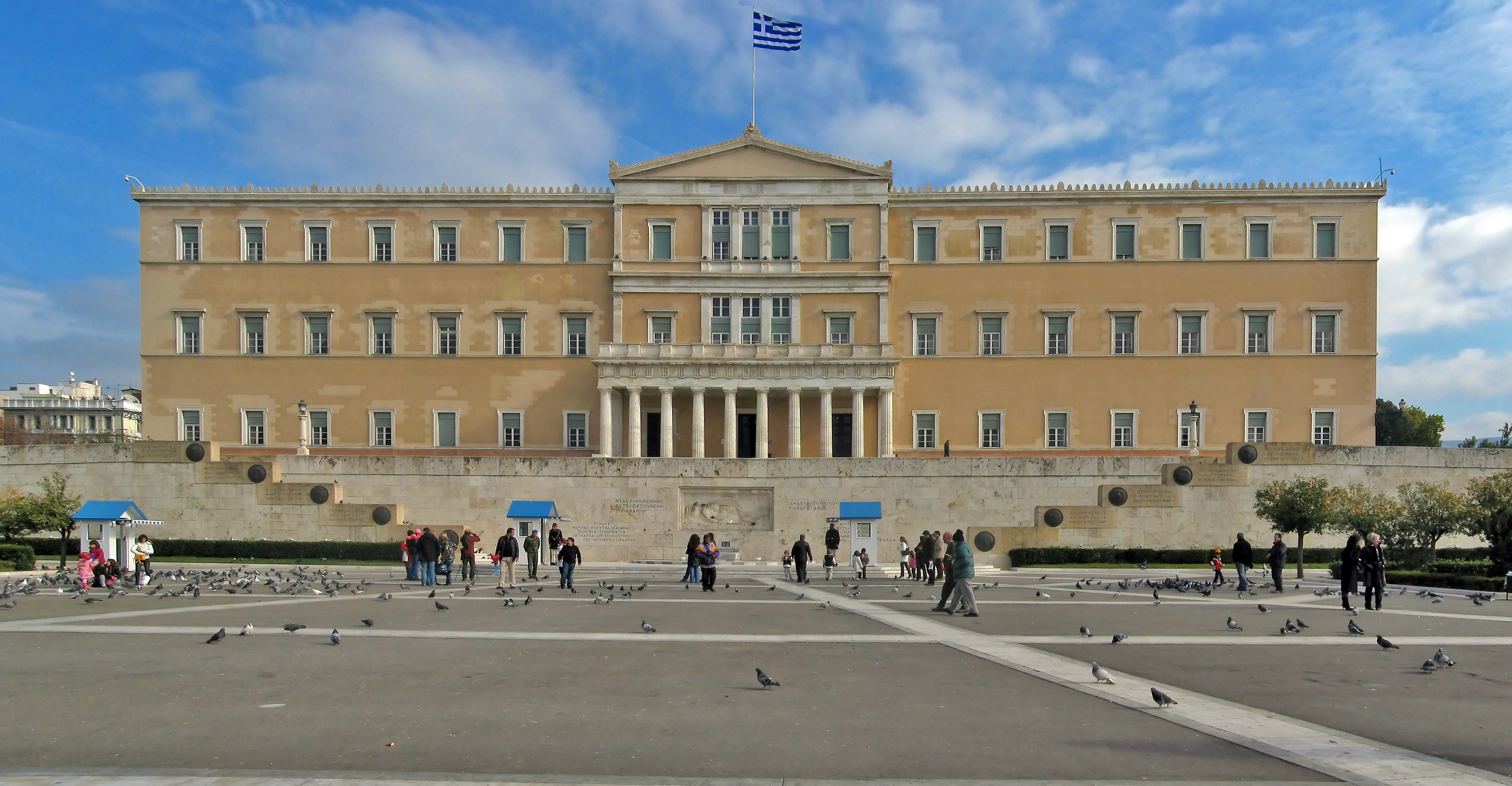
The Hellenic Parliament in Athens

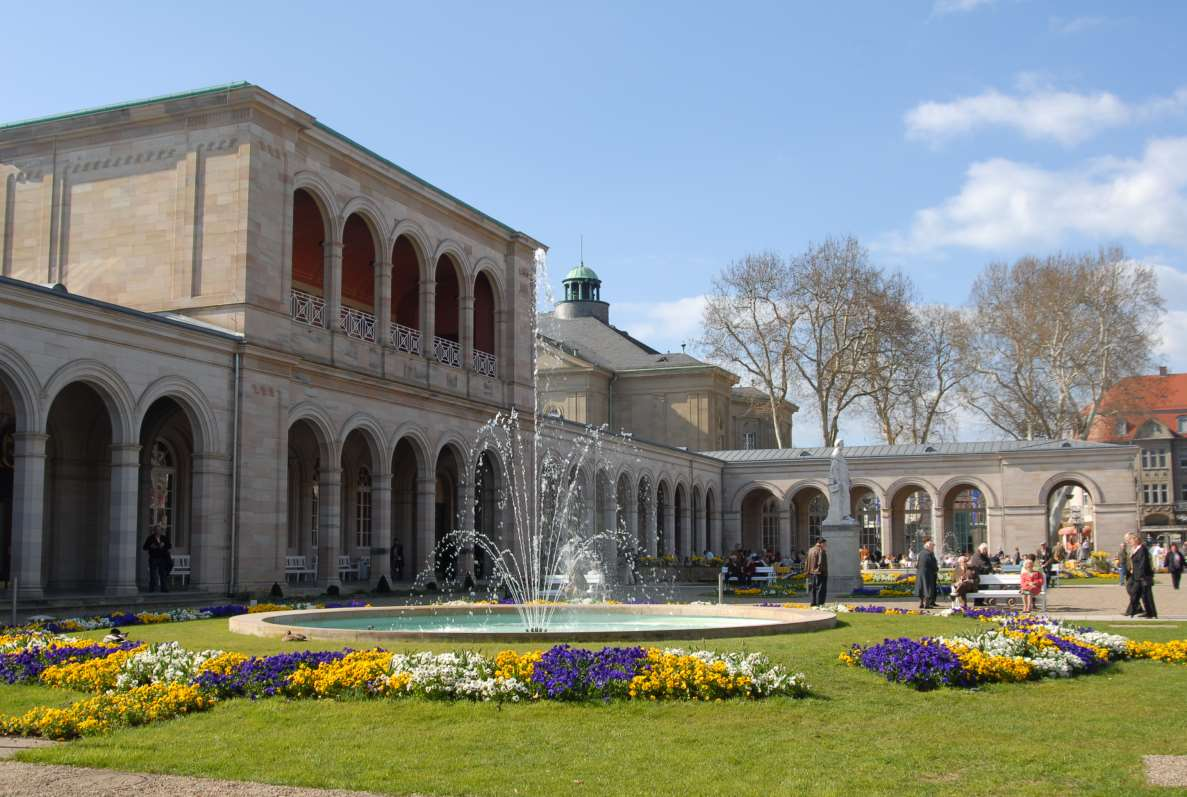
Arcades in Bad Kissingen

Friedrich von Gärtner (10 December 1791 in Koblenz – 21 April 1847 in Munich) was a German architect.

== Biography ==
His father was also an architect, and moved in 1804 to Munich, where young Gärtner received his first education in architecture. To complete that education, he went in 1812 to Paris, where he studied under Percier, and in 1814 to Italy, where he spent four years in the earnest study of antiquities. The fruits of this labor appeared in 1819 in some views accompanied by descriptions of the principal monuments of Sicily (Ansichten der am meisten erhaltenen Monumente Siciliens).

After a visit to England, Gärtner was appointed, in 1820, professor of architecture in the Academy of Munich. His work as a practical architect began with this appointment. In 1822 Friedrich von Gärtner was appointed artistic director of the Nymphenburg Porcelain Manufactory. Gärtner eventually became head government surveyor of buildings and from 1842 director of the Academy of Fine Arts in Munich.

He is buried in the Alter Südfriedhof in Munich. His son Friedrich Gärtner was a noted architectural painter.

== Work ==
Gärtner and Leo von Klenze are the most well known architects of Bavaria during the reign of Ludwig I. His architecture was generally in the Romanesque style and much to the king's taste.

Gärtner's Ludwigskirche in the Ludwigstrasse in Munich strongly influenced other church architecture, especially in North America.

=== Main projects ===
- In Munich
  - Feldherrnhalle,
  - Siegestor
  - LMU Munich's university building
  - Bayerische Staatsbibliothek
  - Wittelsbacher Palais (destroyed).
- Pompejanum in Aschaffenburg
- Kursaal and Arcades in Bad Kissingen
- He began the Befreiungshalle in Kelheim that was redesigned by the architect Leo von Klenze and built accordingly.
- Old Royal Palace in Athens, a building now used as the Hellenic Parliament
