= Münchner Freiheit =

Square in Munich

Coordinates: 48.161°N 11.586°E

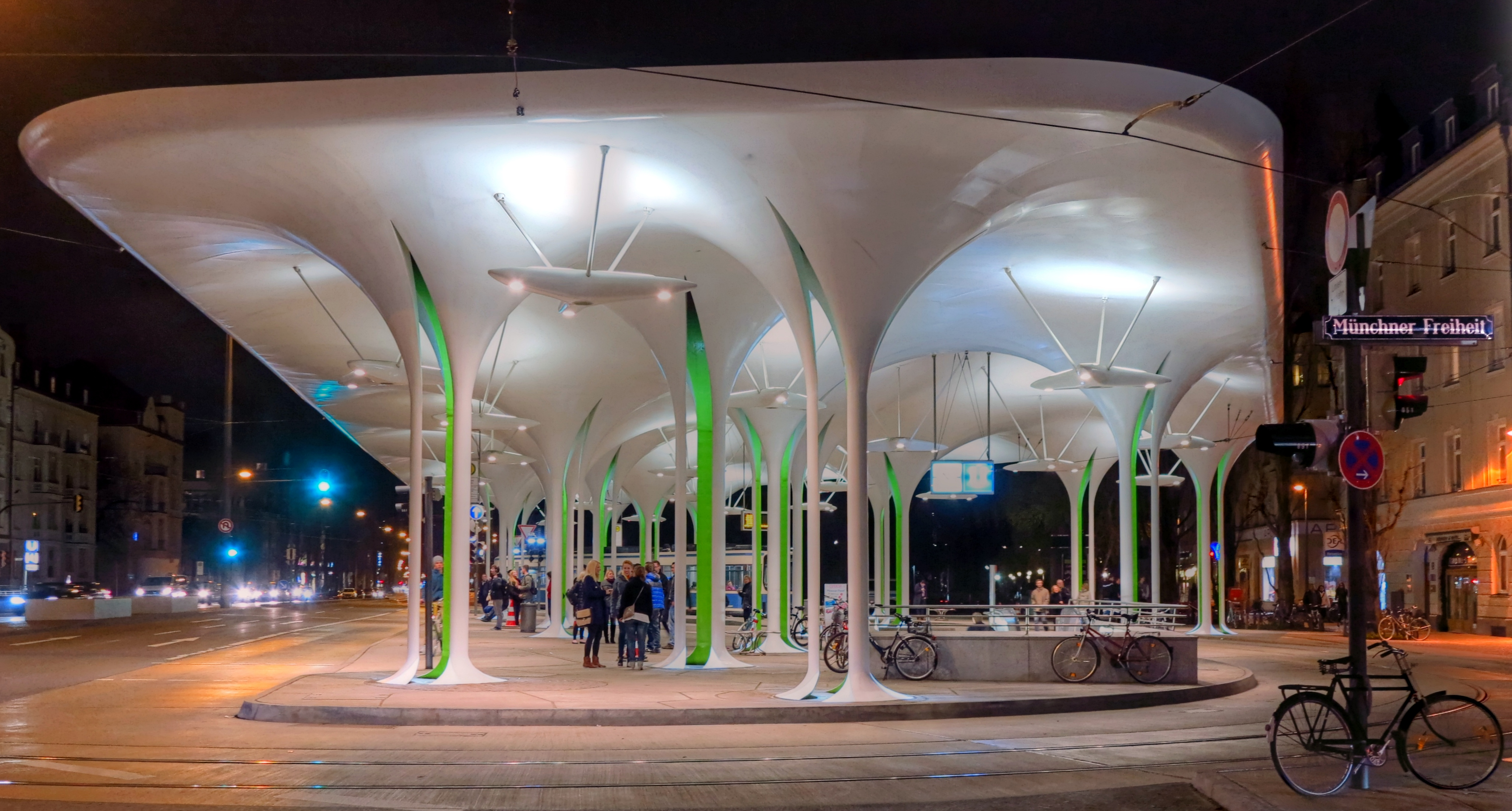
Tram and bus terminal at Münchner Freiheit

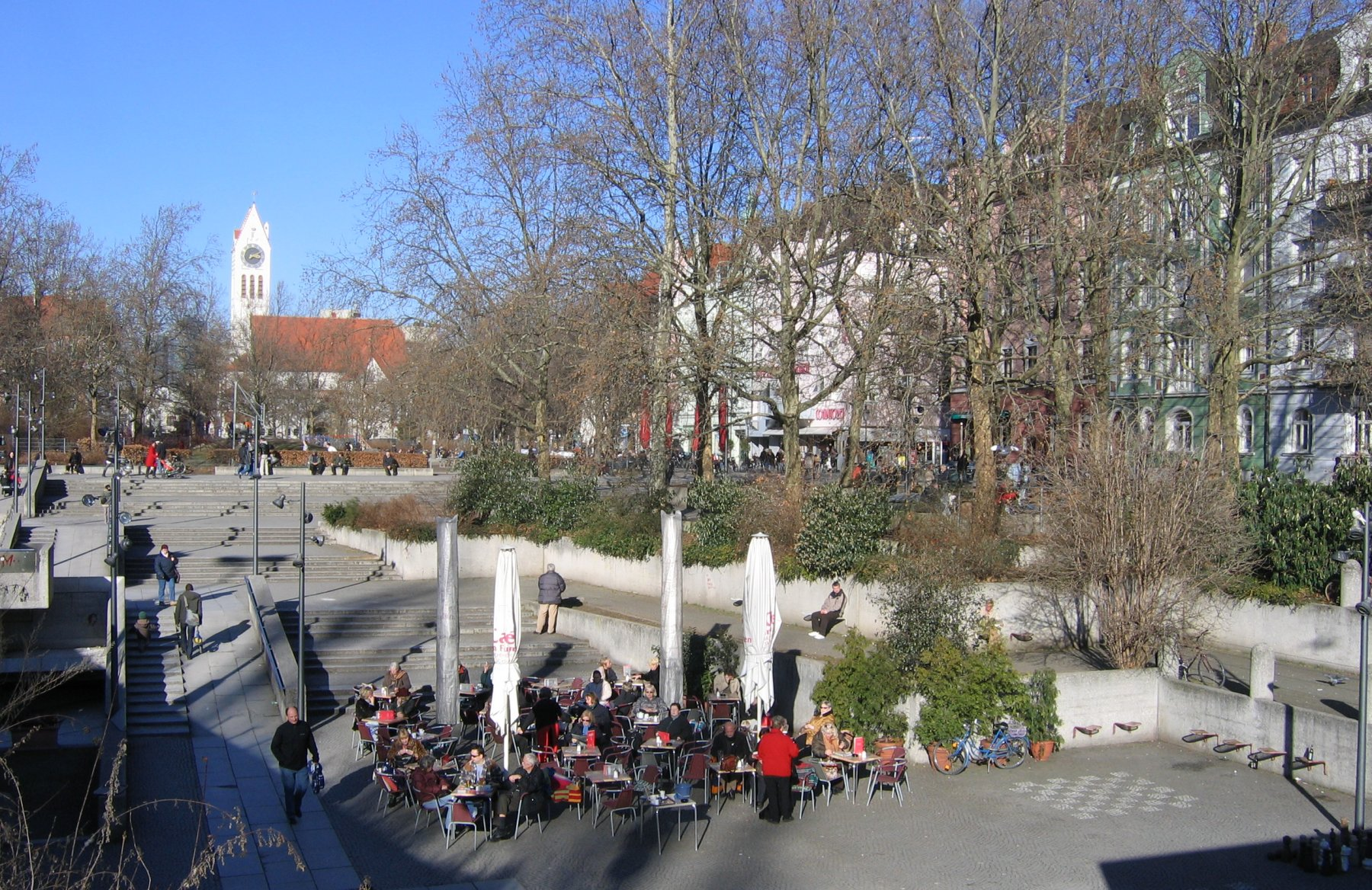
Münchner Freiheit, looking north

The Münchner Freiheit (called Münchener Freiheit until 1998) is a square in Munich's Schwabing, near the English Garden. It is a popular tourist attraction, especially during winter when one of Munich's largest Christmas markets takes place.

The square's Munich U-Bahn station is Münchner Freiheit.

A German pop group, Münchener Freiheit, derived their name from the location, and have retained the original spelling.

== Origin of the name ==
The square at Leopoldstraße was originally known as Feilitzsch Platz, after a Bavarian interior minister. In 1933 it was renamed Danziger Freiheit or "Danzig freedom", in expression of the wish to see the city of Danzig returned to German rule. In tribute to an anti-Nazi resistance group, Freiheitsaktion Bayern, who had taken over two Munich radio towers in 1945, the name Münchener Freiheit or "Munich freedom" was selected following the war. The alternative spelling Münchner Freiheit was adopted by the city council in 1998 though Münchener Freiheit remains popular.
