= Ludwigstraße =

Royal avenue in Munich, Bavaria

Coordinates: 48.146°N 11.579°E

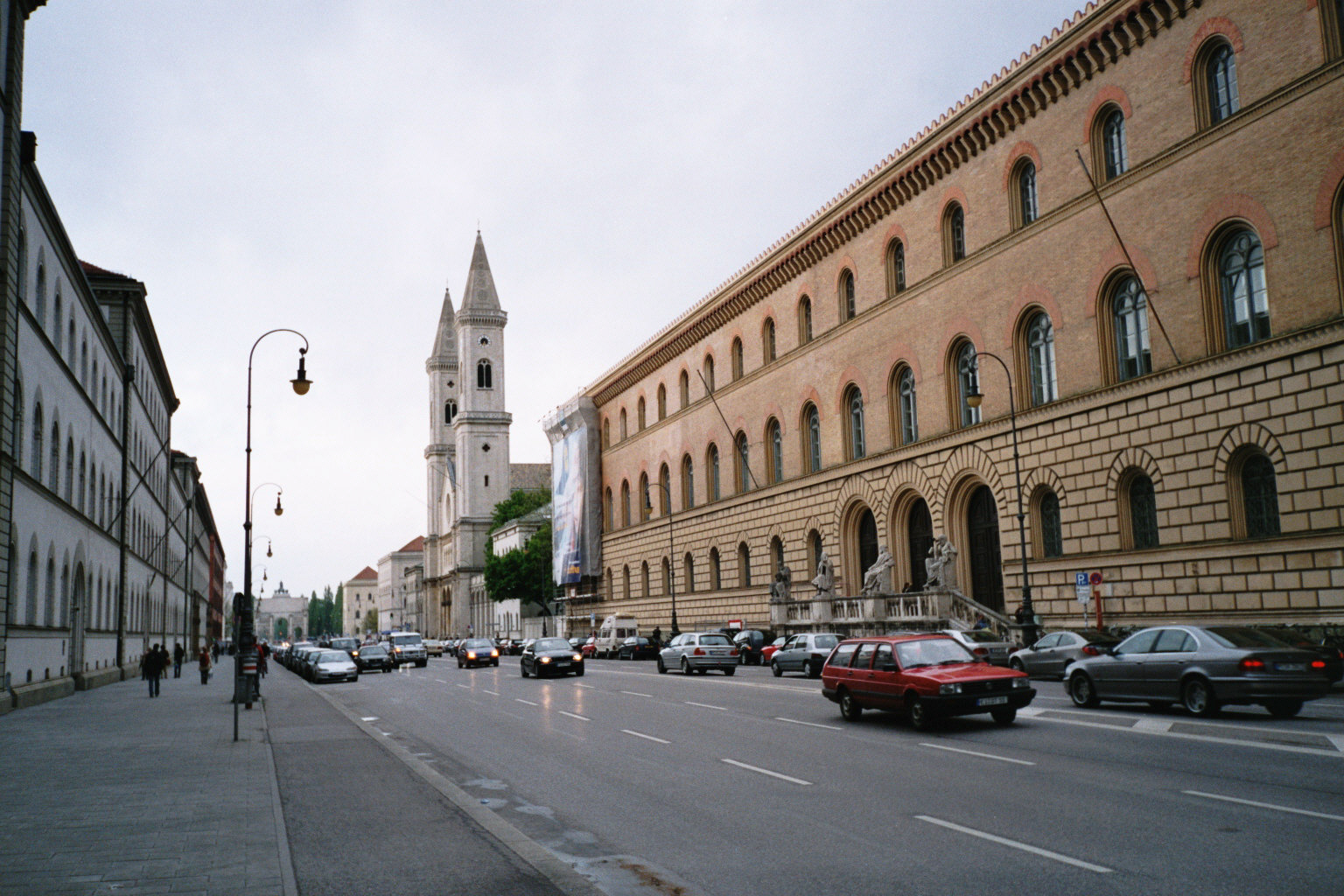
Ludwigstraße, Munich

The Ludwigstraße in Munich is one of the city's four royal avenues next to the Brienner Straße, the Maximilianstraße and the Prinzregentenstraße. The avenue is named after King Ludwig I of Bavaria. The city's grandest boulevard still maintains its architectural uniformity envisioned as a grand street "worthy the kingdom" as requested by the king. The Ludwigstraße has served for state parades and funeral processions.

== Architecture ==
The Municipality of the royal residence and capital city of Munich was first not enthusiastic about the extent of the new boulevard. The city authorities sought to impose a cut of the road, as they wrongly considered Munich not to grow in 100 years up to 1 km beyond the former city walls. Only when King Ludwig I threatened to transfer the residence to another city, the magistrate relented and approved the General Plan.

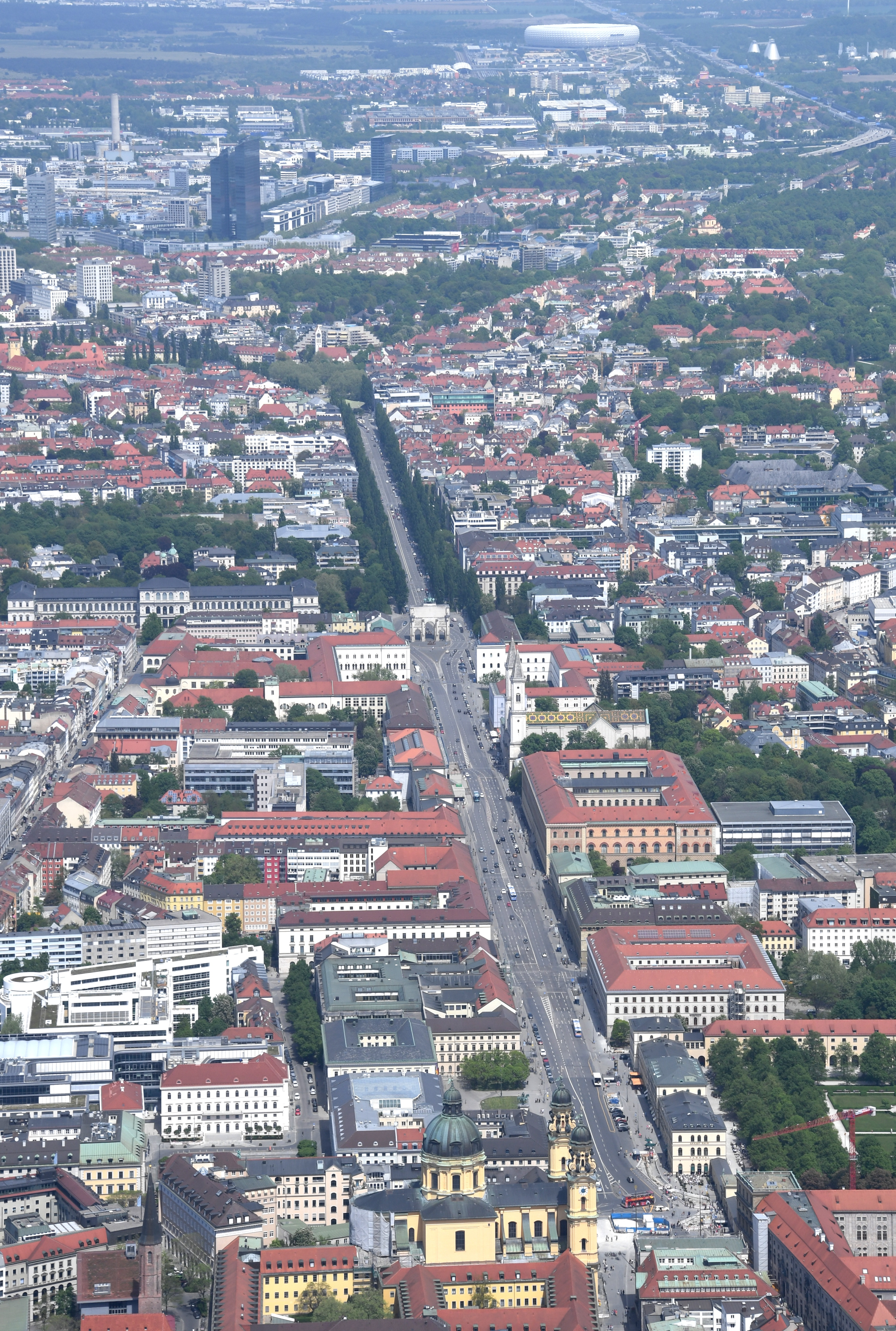
Aerial image of the Ludwigstraße (in front of the Siegestor in the center of the image) and the Leopoldstraße (behind the Siegestor)

The avenue begins at Odeonsplatz and runs from south to north, it leads from the Feldherrnhalle in the south to the Siegestor in the north, skirting the Ludwig-Maximilians-Universität München (LMU), the St. Ludwig Church, the Bayerische Staatsbibliothek (Bavarian State Library) and other state ministries and palaces.

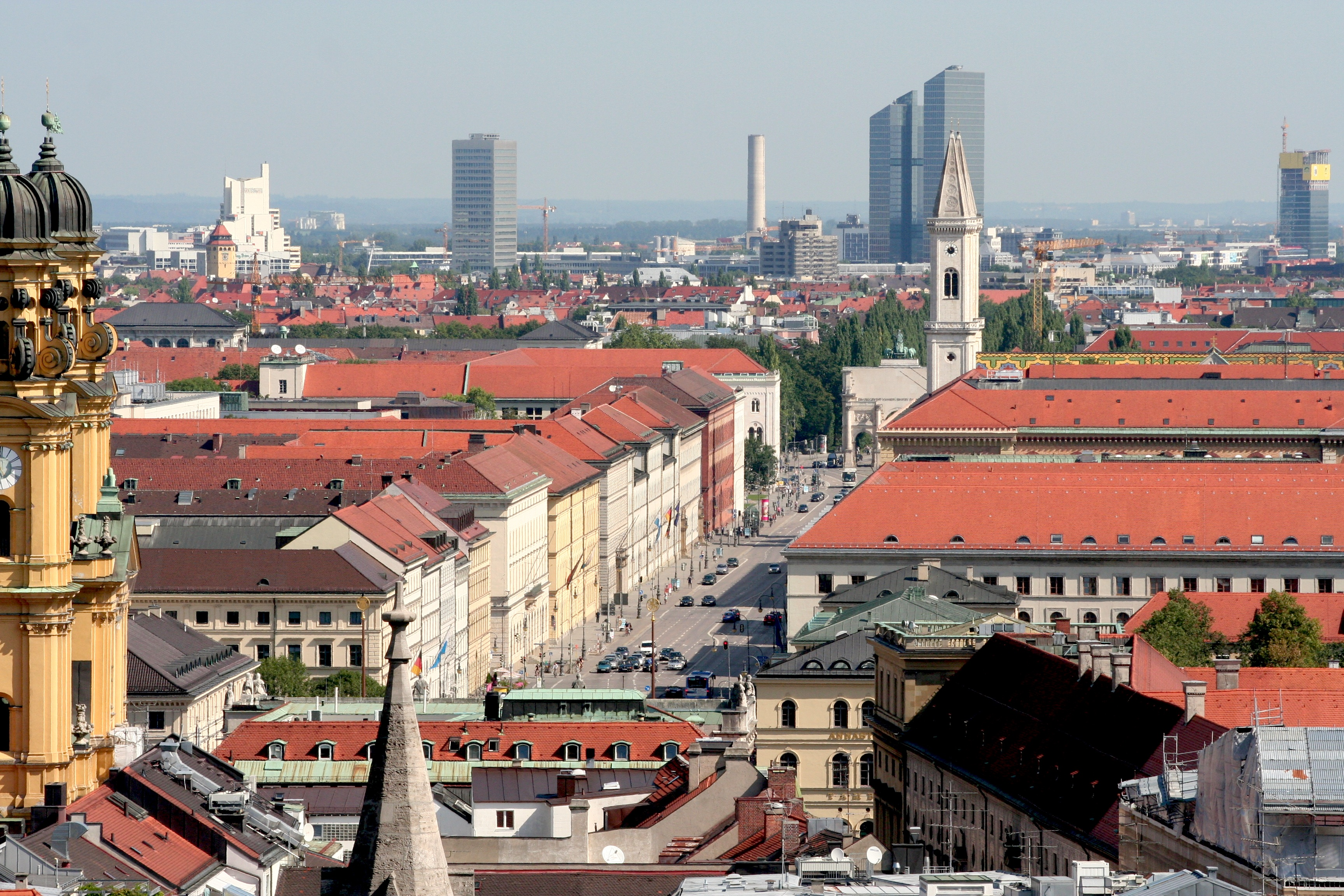
View of the Ludwigstraße from above

The southern part of the avenue was constructed in Italian Renaissance style by Leo von Klenze from 1816 onwards. Klenze's last building was the Royal Ministry of War (Ludwigstr 14, today Bavarian State Archives; 1824–1830). Starting with the Bavarian State Library the northern part was then constructed since 1827 in line with a plan of Klenze's rival Friedrich von Gärtner. The appearance is strongly influenced by Italian romanesque architecture, which developed a new architectural style, the 'arched style' (Rundbogenstil).

Some buildings were constructed during the Third Reich, such as the Bavarian Department of Agriculture and the new construction which replaced the former Herzog-Max-Palais. One of the best palaces of Klenze it was demolished and today houses the Bavarian head office of the Deutsche Bundesbank. After the World War II the opening in the middle of the Ludwigstraße for the new circular road Altstadtring caused further demolition and nowadays disturbs the original closed coverage type of the avenue which did not permit broad byroads.

Its extension north of the Siegestor in Schwabing is called Leopoldstraße. At its entrance northwest of the Siegestor is the building of the Academy of Fine Arts. In the distance further north in Schwabing, the Highlight Towers are visible.

The U3 and U6 lines of the Munich U-Bahn run under the Ludwigstraße, with a station at Odeonsplatz and a station at LMU Munich.

== Main sights ==
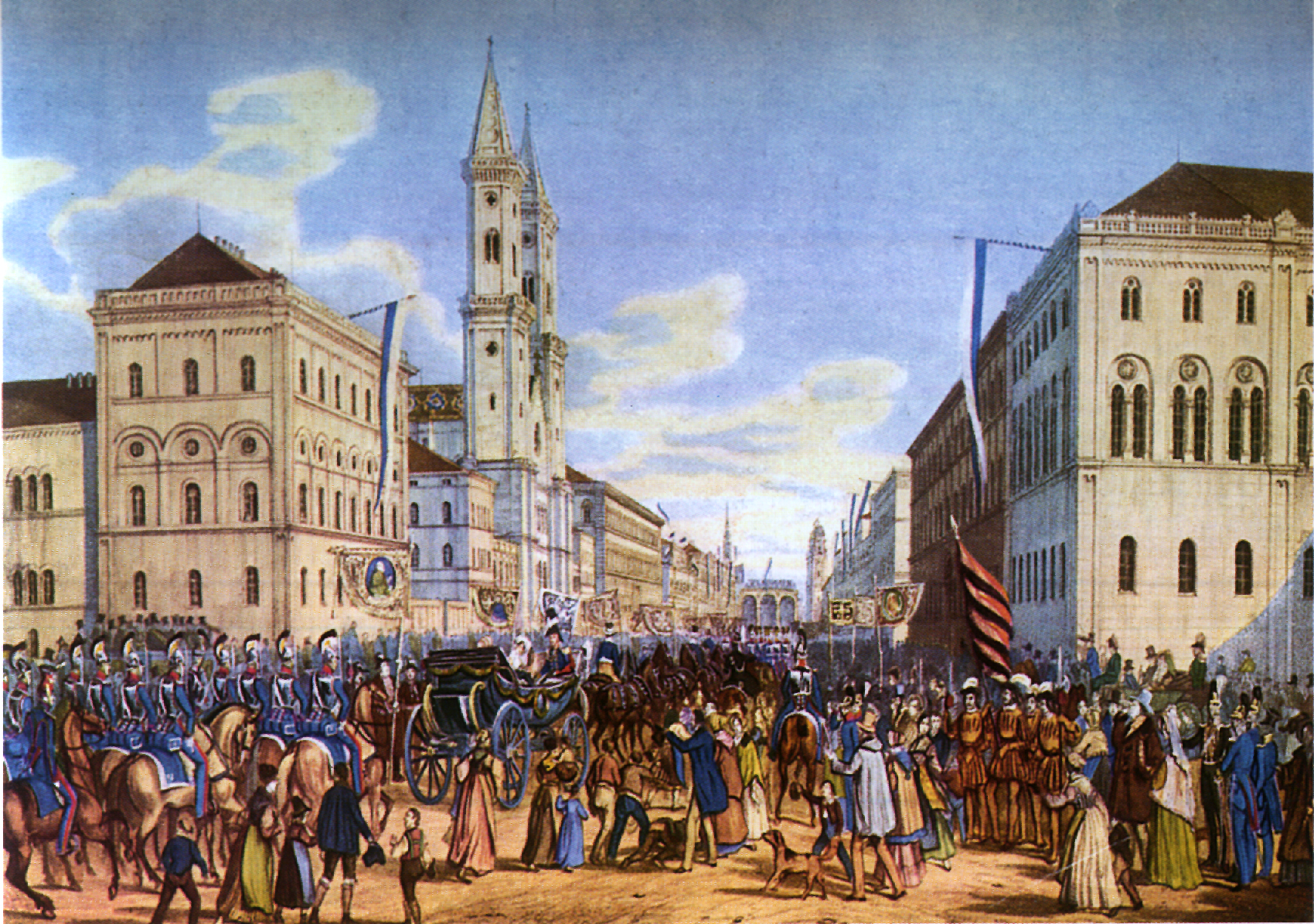
Ludwigstraße in 1842, state reception for Crown Princess Marie of Prussia

From south to north

- Odeonsplatz with the former Odeon and the Palais Leuchtenberg
- Bavarian Main Records Office (Bavarian Hauptstaatsarchiv, former Bavarian Ministry of War; Leo von Klenze, 1824–1830) (Ludwigstr. 14)
- Bavarian State Library (Bayerische Staatsbibliothek; Friedrich von Gärtner, 1832–1842) (Ludwigstr. 16)
- Bavarian Higher Administrative Court (Bayerischer Verwaltungsgerichtshof; former convent building, Friedrich von Gärtner, 1840–1843) (Ludwigstr. 23)
- Seminar Building of LMU Munich (Former Blindeninstitut; Friedrich von Gärtner, 1833–1825) (Ludwigstr. 25)
- Former headquarters of the BHS-Bayerische Berg-, Hütten- und Salzwerke AG (Friedrich von Gärtner, 1840–1843) (Ludwigstr. 27)
- St. Ludwig University Church (Universitätskirche St. Ludwig; Friedrich von Gärtner, 1829–1844)
- Ducal Georgianum (Friedrich von Gärtner, 1834–1841) (Professor-Huber-Platz 1)
- Max-Joseph-Stift (Friedrich von Gärtner, 1837–1840) (Professor-Huber-Platz 2)
- LMU Munich (Friedrich von Gärtner, 1835–1840) (Geschwister-Scholl-Platz 1)
- Siegestor (Friedrich von Gärtner, 1843–1852)
