= St.-Anna-Platz =

Square in Munich, Germany

Coordinates: 48°08′24″N 11°35′15″E

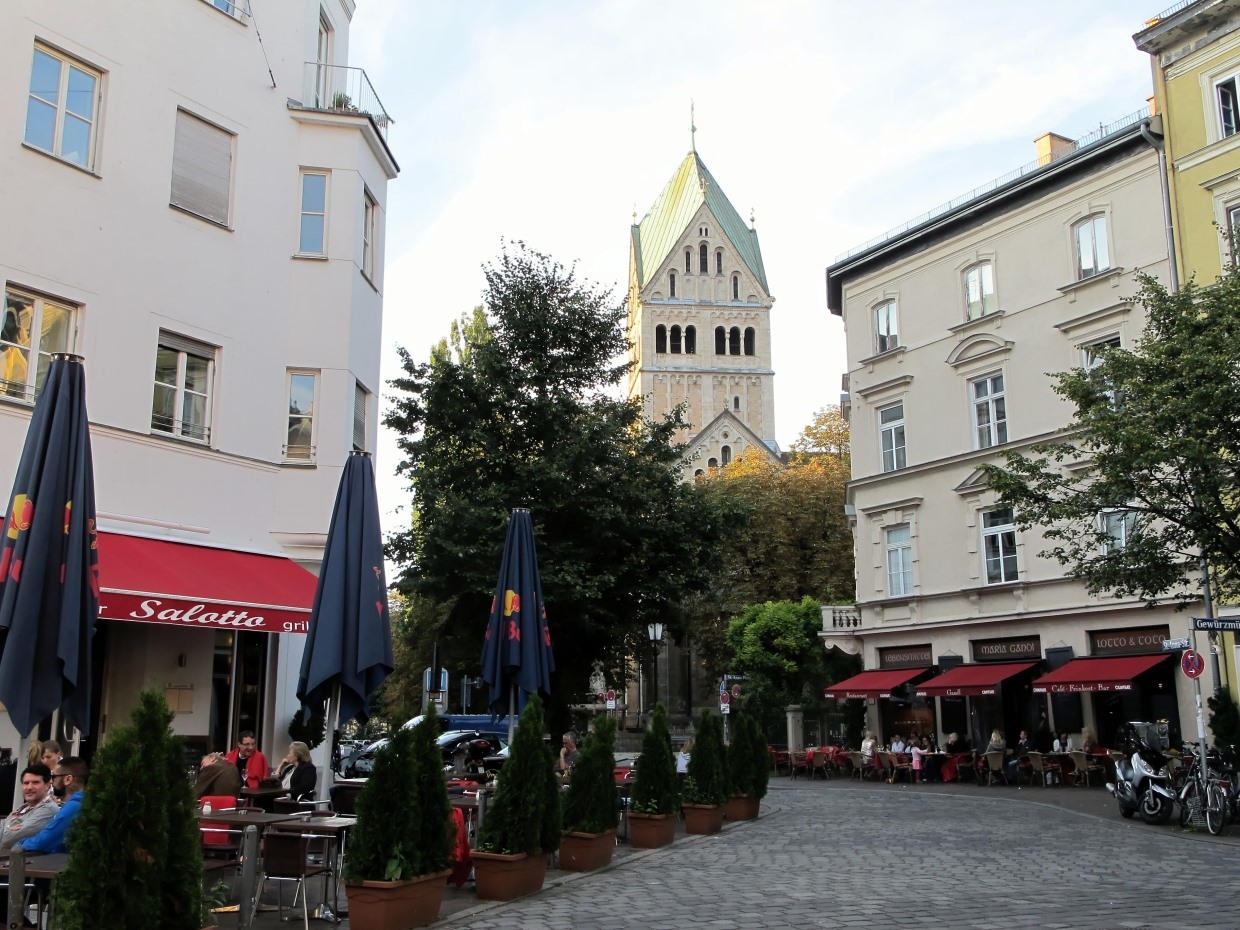

The St. Anna Platz is a square in Munich. It is registered as a listed ensemble in the Bayerische Denkmalliste (Bavarian Historical buildings list).

== Location ==
St.-Anna-Platz is located in the Munich district of Lehel north of Maximilianstraße. It extends from St.-Anna-Straße to the east. On the east side, a short stretch of road connects the square with Triftstraße.

== History ==
The square was created at the end of the 19th century within the construction of the new parish church of St. Anna. Previously, the Franciscan monastery with the Klosterkirche St. Anna im Lehel (monastery church), which had received a neo-Romanesque two-tower façade in 1852/53, stood here only in the west.

The church was built from 1887 to 1892 according to plans by Gabriel von Seidl in neo-Romanesque style. Approximately parallel to this, the edge of the square was built on three sides by various architects in the neo-Renaissance style.

In 1965/66 the façade of the monastery church was reconstructed in baroque style, whereby the original overall impression of the square was lost.

== Picture of the square ==
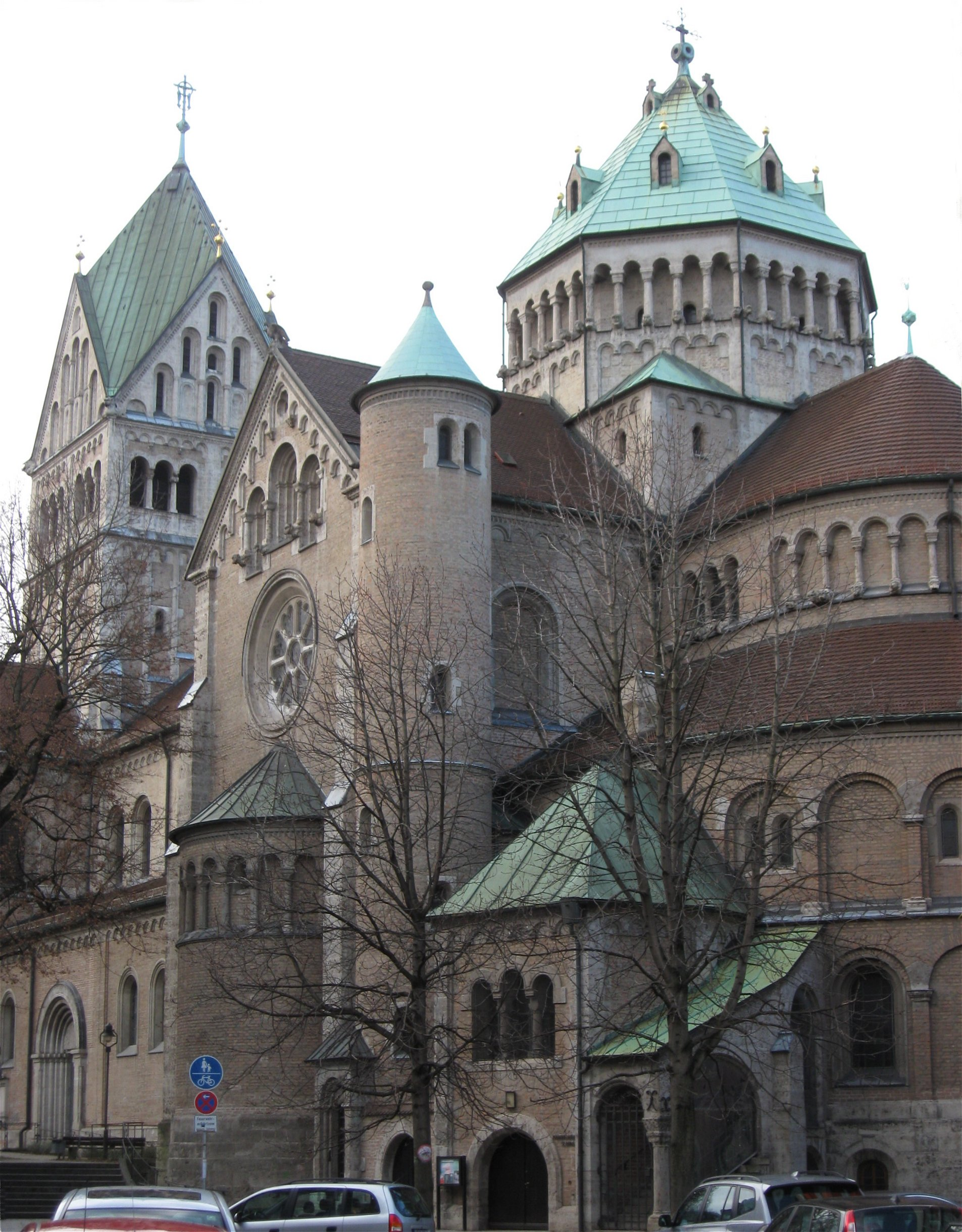
Parish church St. Anna on the St. Anna square

The St.-Anna-Platz has an approximately rectangular shape with a length of about 100 m and a width of about 75 m. It is slightly widened towards St.-Anna-Straße.

In the middle of the square, the neo-Romanesque parish church stands elevated on a terrace surrounded by a low enclosure wall. Opposite it on the other side of St.-Anna's-Straße is the Franciscan monastery with the baroque façade of the monastery church. Part of the northern side of the square is occupied by the southern wing of St.-Anna's-Grammar School.

The square has been rebuilt on three sides, only the west side on St.-Anna-Straße is exposed. The row of houses on the south side (No. 1, 1a, 2, 3, 4) is completely preserved, the houses are listed as historical buildings. Of the remaining houses, only no. 9 in the north-east corner and the St.-Anna-Gymnasium have been preserved and are listed as historical buildings. In the southwest of the square is the St.-Anna-Fountain, also built by Gabriel von Seidl in 1894.

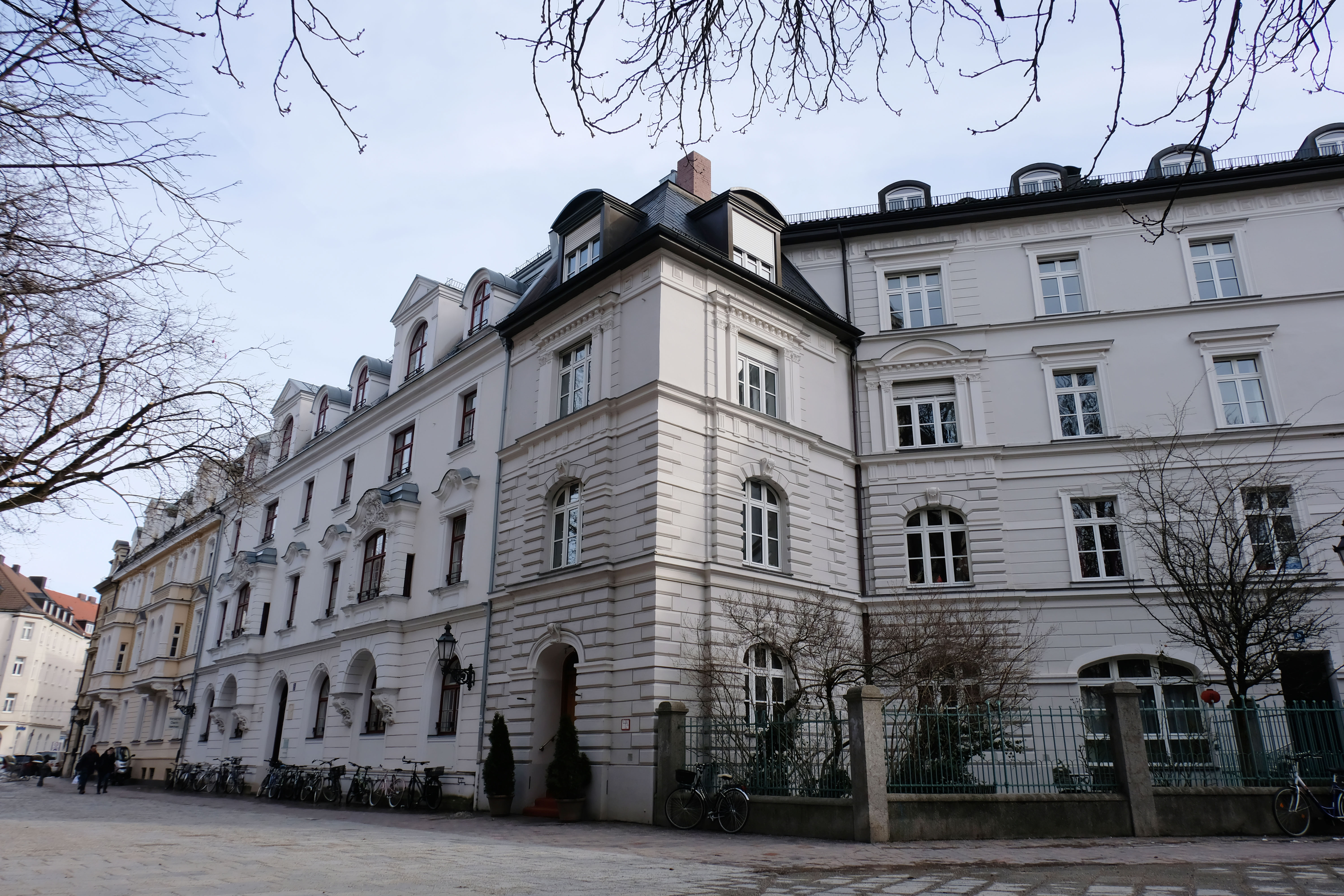
St.-Anna-Platz in Munich, ensemble of houses on the south side

== Miscellaneous ==
In the house at St.-Anna-Platz 2, the writer Lion Feuchtwanger spent his childhood from 1889 to 1900. A commemorative plaque is attached to the house, which was created in 1966 by the sculptor Karl Oppenrieder.
