= Blumenstraße 29 =

Historical building in Munich, Germany

Coordinates: 48°07′54″N 11°34′15″E

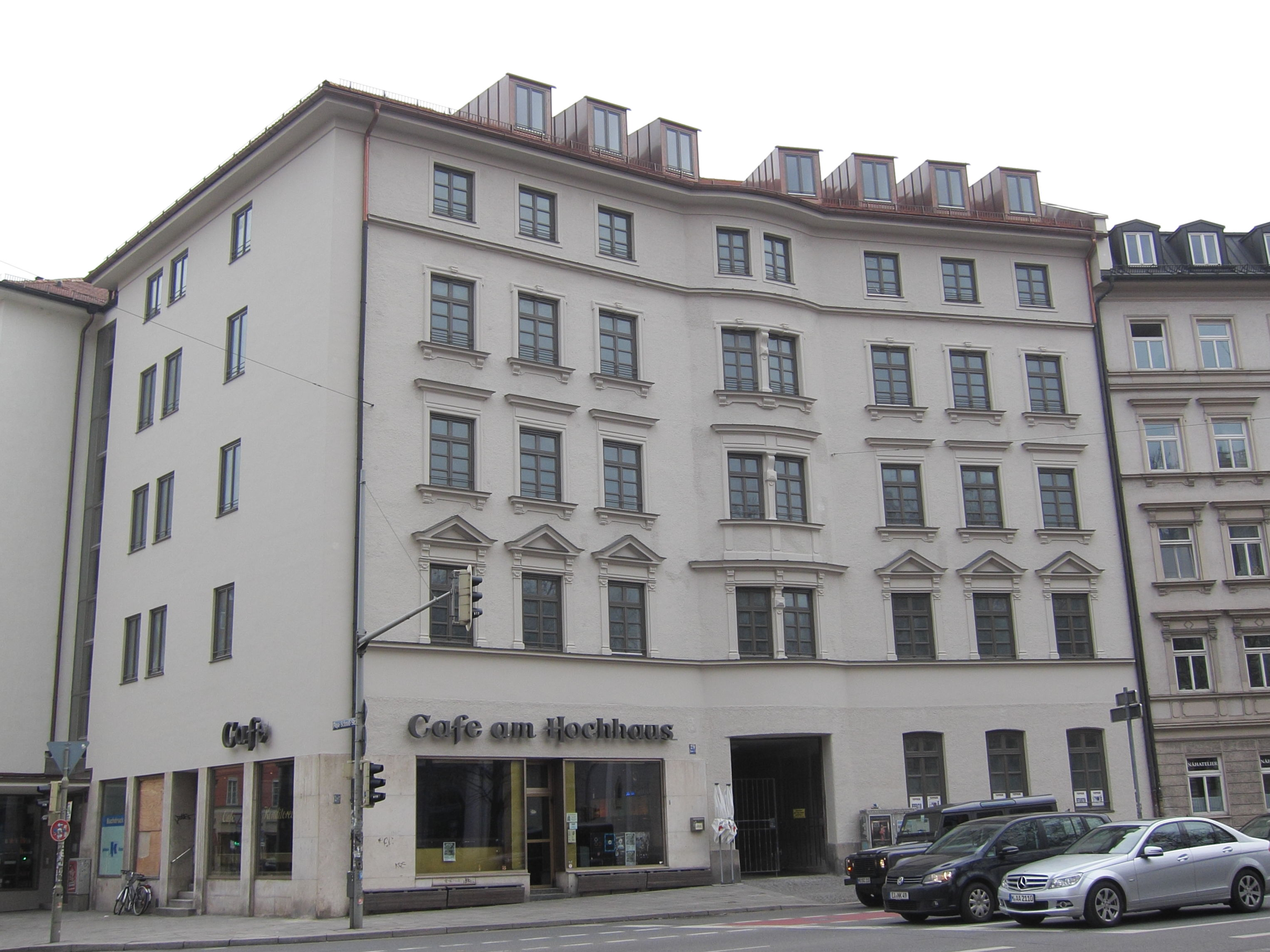
Guest and rental house Blumenstraße 29

The building at Blumenstraße 29 in Munich is a guest and rental house. It is registered as a historical monument building in the Bavarian List of Monuments.

== Location ==
The building is located in the south of the Angerviertel (Anger-quarter) in the Munich old town, in the district No 1 Altstadt-Lehel am Altstadtring. It is the only house on the south side of Blumenstraße, between Angertorstraße and Papa-Schmid-Straße, the corner house to the west belongs to Angertorstraße. The site is located outside the original city walls, in front of the Angertor, and in the area of the Baroque wall fortification from the 17th century, therefore listing it as historically protected.

== History ==
On the bastion in front of the Angertor, a garden in geometrical forms can already be seen on maps from the mid-18th century. Towards the end of the 18th century, under Elector Karl Theodor, there was the Glasgarten, an inn (now Blumenstraße 29) with a park-like garden on the former bastion.

Brewery owner Mathias Pschorr had the building renovated and expanded in 1851 and built additional buildings, including one of three-stories, on its narrow side on the Blumenstraße three-axle extension with two superimposed halls left of the main building, and several additional buildings on the edge of the former bastion.

The builder and contractor, Ludwig Deiglmeier, acquired the area towards the end of the 19th century. He continued to add onto the building in 1889 and rebuilt the wing to the right of the entrance axis. He also built adjacent to the corner building Angertorstraße 1 (1888–1889) and its adjacent building Angertorstraße 3 (1888–1890).

From 2004 to 2014, the cafeteria on the ground floor was the bar Café am Hochhaus, which had to close after the lease expired in August 2014. The restaurant area, like the entire building in the years before was to be renovated, to which its use before the renovations were complete was denied due to fire safety reasons.
