= Theodor Baierl =

German painter

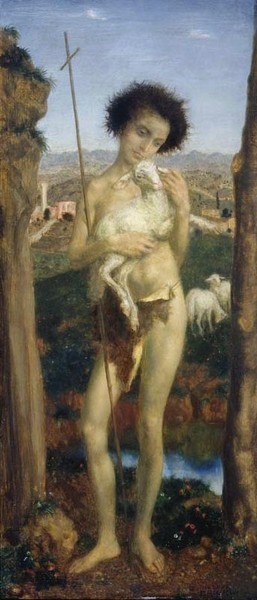
St.John the Baptist, oil on panel, c. 1920. The Jack Daulton Collection, Los Altos Hills, California.

Theodor Baierl (8 November 1881, Munich – 1932, Munich) was a German painter and fresco artist.

== Life and work ==
He came from a humble background, but was able to attend the Academy of Fine Arts, Munich, where he studied with Martin von Feuerstein, Carl von Marr, Hugo von Habermann and Franz von Stuck. He became a member of the Munich Secession. However, he was also fond of art from the Middle Ages and the Quattrocento, both of which heavily influenced his style and thematic content. Several paintings, such as "Ritter mit Tod" (Knight with Death), are obvious homages to Albrecht Dürer.

His mastery of the old techniques led to his popularity as a church painter and many of the frescoes he executed throughout Bavaria are often mistaken for older pieces. Some of his most prominent works include: the apse of St. Maximilian Church (Munich), the Stations of the Cross in the Herz-Jesu-Kirche (Augsburg), the apse in St. Johanniskirche (Schweinfurt) and the altarpiece at the Fugger Chapel at Kirchheim in Schwaben. He also designed glass paintings.

During the First World War, his church-related commissions disappeared and were never fully restored. As a result, he changed his approach, devoting himself to easel paintings of an allegorical or historical nature, eventually modernizing his style; although he never reattained his earlier level of popularity and died in obscurity.
