= Erwin Schleich =

German architect (1925–1992)

- Born: 20 April 1925; Munich, German Reich
- Died: 13 August 1992 (aged 67); Munich, Germany
- Education: Technical University of Munich
- Occupations: Architect; architectural conservator; architectural historian

Erwin Schleich (20 April 1925 – 13 August 1992) was a German architect, architectural conservator, and architectural historian known for his post-war reconstruction of buildings and monuments in Munich.

== Biography ==
Erwin Schleich was born in Munich. He graduated from the Wilhelmsgymnasium in 1943, and from 1947 to 1951, he studied architecture at the Technical University of Munich. In 1957, he received his doctorate on the subject The Peterskirche in Munich, its building history and its relationship to the city in the Middle Ages, presented on the basis of the results of the excavations.

Schleich later worked as a freelance architect and was responsible for the restoration and reconstruction of numerous monuments in Munich. In 1973, he was appointed to the Landesdenkmalrat, or State Monument Council. The Bavarian State Historic Preservation Law of 1973, which boosted cultural heritage preservation in the state, emerged from a suggestion by Schleich.

In contrast with the growing trend towards modernism in post-war Germany, historical preservationists like Schleich kept the spirit of traditionalism alive when rebuilding Munich after the war. For example, in the case of Klosterkirche St. Anna im Lehel in 1968, Schleich reconstructed Johann Michael Fischer's original 18th century Rococo façade, instead of August von Voit's 19th century neo-Romanesque façade, which had been destroyed in the war. In the case of Heilig-Geist-Kirche in 1970, Schleich replaced the simple white interiors of the church's 1950s renovation with recreations of its original frescoes and Rococo ornamentation.

From 1974 to 1991, Schleich was a member of the board of directors of the Bavarian Association for Home Care. He died in Munich on 13 August 1992.

== Selected projects ==
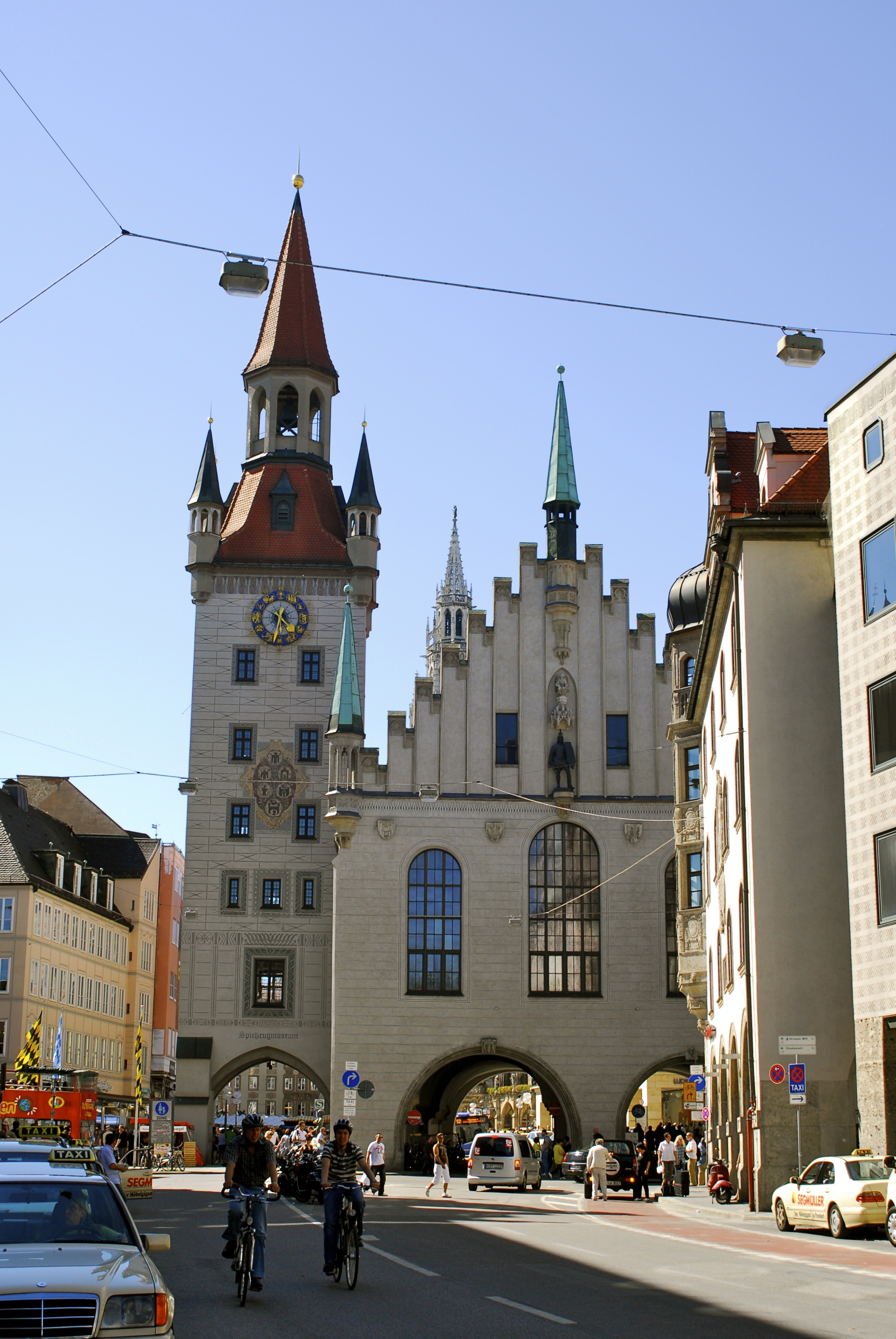
Tower at Altes Rathaus in Munich

- 1946–1955: Reconstruction of St. Peter's Church in Munich
- 1955: Reconstruction of the Ruffinihaus in Munich
- 1956–1973: Reconstruction of the Ludwigskirche in Munich
- 1956–1959: Reconstruction of the Palais Preysing in Munich
- 1957–1979: Reconstruction of the Damenstiftskirche St. Anna in Munich
- 1960–1962: Reconstruction of the Hotel Bayerischer Hof in Munich
- 1962–1964: Reconstruction of the former Augustinian Church on Neuhauser Straße in Munich; today the German Hunting and Fishing Museum
- 1966–1975: New construction of the Cathedral of the Intercession of the Mother of God and of St. Andrew in Munich
- 1968: Reconstruction of the façade of the Klosterkirche St. Anna im Lehel in Munich
- 1970: Interior renovation of the Heilig-Geist-Kirche in Munich
- 1971–1974: New construction of the tower at the Altes Rathaus for the 1972 Summer Olympics in Munich
- 1971–1980: Restoration of the Palais Montgelas and expansion into the Hotel Bayerischer Hof in Munich
- 1981–1983: Restoration of the Possenhofen Castle complex in Possenhofen
