= Munich Centre (electoral district) =

Federal electoral district of Germany

- München-Mitte
- Former electoral district for the Bundestag
- State list: Bavaria
- State: Bavaria
- Major settlements: Munich

Former electoral district
- Created: 1965
- Abolished: 2002

Munich Centre (German: München-Mitte) is an electoral constituency (German: Wahlkreis) in Bavaria that was represented in the Bundestag. It was one of five Bundestag constituencies in the Bavarian capital of Munich from 1965 to 2002. Since the redrawing of Bavarian electoral districts in 2002, Munich has had only four constituencies, as was the case from 1949 to 1965. The area of the Munich-Mitte constituency was divided among the Munich West/Centre, Munich North, Munich East and Munich South constituencies.

== Members ==
| Election | Name | Party | First votes | Constituency name | Area |
|---|---|---|---|---|---|
| 1965 | Konstantin Prinz von Bayern | CSU | 45.2% | 204 München-Mitte | Altstadt, Lehel, Ludwigsvorstadt, Isarvorstadt, Maxvorstadt, Schwabing-West |
| 1969 | Manfred Schmidt | SPD | 48.4% | 204 München-Mitte | Altstadt, Lehel, Ludwigsvorstadt, Isarvorstadt, Maxvorstadt, Schwabing-West |
| 1972 | Manfred Schmidt | SPD | 49.9% | 204 München-Mitte | Altstadt, Lehel, Ludwigsvorstadt, Isarvorstadt, Maxvorstadt, Schwabing-West |
| 1976 | Hans Klein | CSU | 46.2% | 204 München-Mitte | Altstadt, Lehel, Ludwigsvorstadt, Isarvorstadt, Maxvorstadt, Schwabing-West, Untersendling, Neuhausen |
| 1980 | Manfred Schmidt | SPD | 45.6% | 203 München-Mitte | Altstadt, Lehel, Ludwigsvorstadt, Isarvorstadt, Maxvorstadt, Schwabing-West, Untersendling, Neuhausen |
| 1983 | Manfred Schmidt | SPD | 44.0% | 203 München-Mitte | Altstadt, Lehel, Ludwigsvorstadt, Isarvorstadt, Maxvorstadt, Schwabing-West, Untersendling, Neuhausen |
| 1987 | Hans Klein | CSU | 40.2% | 203 München-Mitte | Altstadt, Lehel, Ludwigsvorstadt, Isarvorstadt, Maxvorstadt, Schwabing-West, Untersendling, Neuhausen |
| 1990 | Ulrike Mascher | SPD | 38.1% | 203 München-Mitte | Altstadt, Lehel, Ludwigsvorstadt, Isarvorstadt, Maxvorstadt, Schwabing-West, Untersendling, Neuhausen |
| 1994 | Ulrike Mascher | SPD | 40.8% | 203 München-Mitte | Altstadt, Lehel, Ludwigsvorstadt, Isarvorstadt, Maxvorstadt, Schwabing-West, Untersendling, Neuhausen, Haidhausen, Au |
| 1998 | Ulrike Mascher | SPD | 45.2% | 203 München-Mitte | Altstadt, Lehel, Ludwigsvorstadt, Isarvorstadt, Maxvorstadt, Schwabing-West, Untersendling, Neuhausen, Haidhausen, Au |
