= Augustinerkirche =

Augustinerkirche (German for "Augustinian Church", after the Augustinian Order) may refer to the following churches:

- Augustinian Church, Vienna in Vienna, Austria
- Augustinerkirche (Munich) in Munich, Germany
- Augustinerkirche Zürich in Zürich, Switzerland
