= Angertorstraße 3 =

Apartment building in Munich, Germany

Coordinates: 48.1313°N 11.5702°E

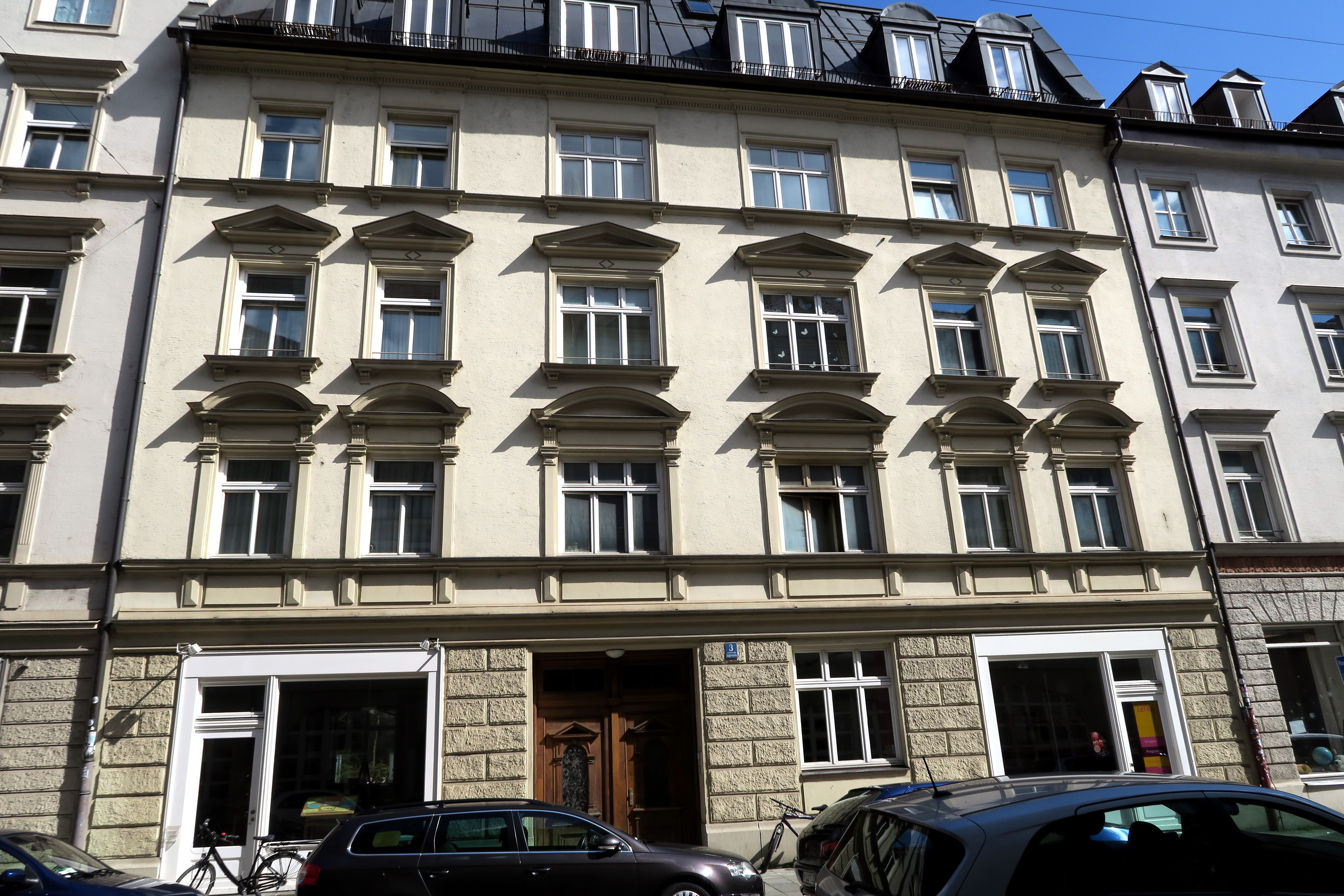
Four-storey street facade in neo-renaissance style

Angertorstraße 3 is an apartment building in Munich, Germany that is a registered Bavarian historical monument.

== Location ==
The building is located in an area outside the Old Town, south of the Angerviertel (Anger quarter) in Münchner Altstadt, in the district No.1 Altstadt-Lehel. It is in the middle of three houses standing on the east side of the Angertorstraße. The Angertorstraße is a road approximately 70 meters long connecting two roads. It connects the Blumenstraße (which belongs to the Altstadtring) to the Müllerstraße. The site was located in the area of the Baroque wall fortification from the 17th century outside the original city walls building in front of the Angertor, and is therefore protected as a Bodendenkmal (Historical Ground).

== History ==
On the bastion in front of the Angertor, the "Glasgarten" is a restaurant (now Blumenstraße 29) with park-like gardens since the end of the 18th century.

The builder and contractor, Ludwig Deiglmeier, acquired the area at the end of the 19th century and built the house at Angertorstraße 3 on the former garden grounds under the supervision of Josef Ringer (1888–1890). The construction occurred at the same time as the back extension, an added story of the house at Blumenstraße 29 (1889), and the construction of the two connecting corner houses at Angertorstraße 1 (1888/89).

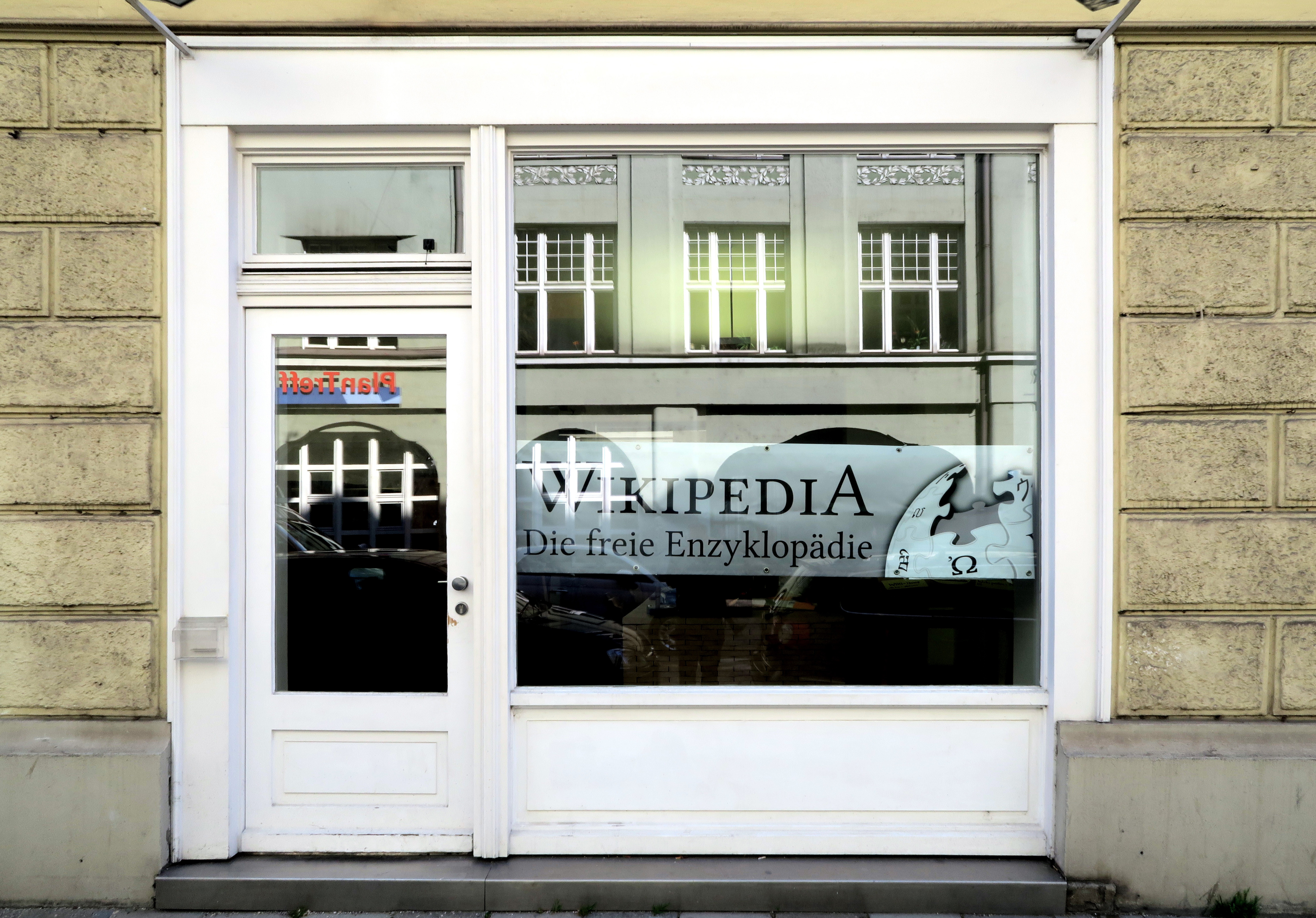
Showcase window of WikiMUC

During the Second World War, the building was damaged. Although the damage was not severe, the building was marked for demolition, along with the surrounding buildings. The large-scale breakthrough with demolition of the entire Angertorstraße was included in the first reconstruction plans from 1946 of the Stadtbaurat Karl Meitinger, the General Transportation Plan of 1958, and the urban development plan of 1963. The southeastern section of Altstadtring was given low priority over other sections, especially that of the Mittleren Ring and abandoned after the criticism of the Altstadtringtunnel and the expansion in the northwest as well as the Isarparallele. Citizen resistance and the Münchner Forum on the not yet built sections led to a complete redesign of the traffic axes.

Since April 11, 2016, the shop on the left side of the building's ground floor housed the WikiMUC, office, meeting place and venue for the Wikipedia community in Munich and southern Germany. The first Wikipedia workshops took place there in June 2016, and the office was officially opened in October 2016. The right side of the ground floor of the building houses the Münchner Lesbenberatung LeTRa.

== Description ==
The building is a four-story building in neo-Renaissance style, with a two-story attic gable roof. The street façade has six window axes; the two outer axes are each narrower and closer together than the two central axes. The ground floor was constructed in rustica style. Continuous window sills on the first and third floors divide the façade horizontally, the window sills on the second floor are separated from each other. The windows of the first floor have round window gables, the gables of the second floor are triangular and the windows of the third floor have no gables. For static support, cast iron columns were originally drawn into the intermediate walls in the shops on the ground floor. One of the columns is uncovered and is located in the main room of the WikiMUC.

On the ground floor, in the third axis from the left, there is a gate leading to the courtyard, closed by a double-winged wooden door with barred glass windows that are covered with Prussian caps, which provides access to the staircase. The main staircase was built in an innovative style, with iron elements covered with wooden planks as steps, thereby maximizing fire protection. On the ground floor, there is a shop on each side of the passageway and the other floors each have two three-room apartments arranged around the staircase.

== Detailed views ==
Details

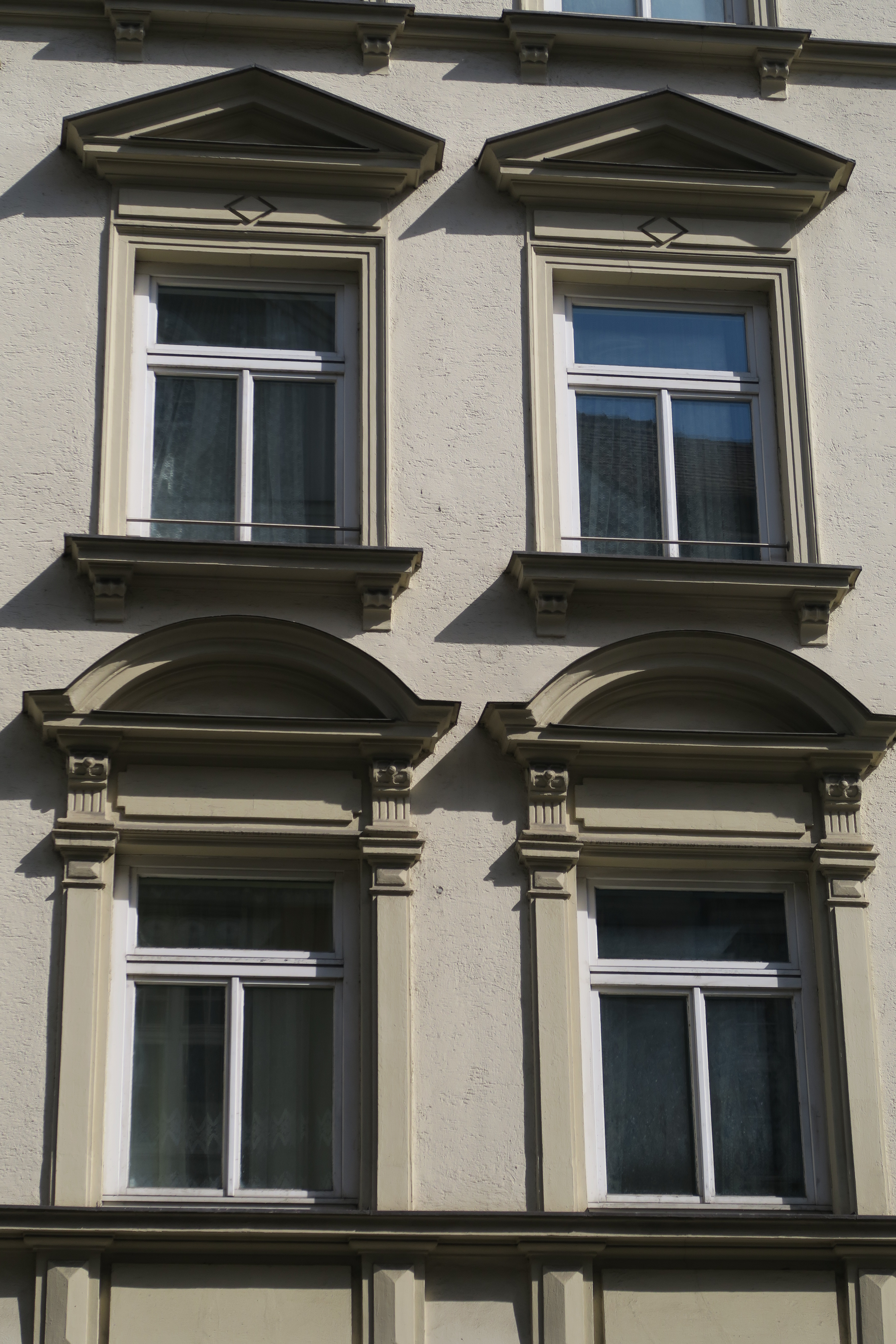
Window gable pointed and round

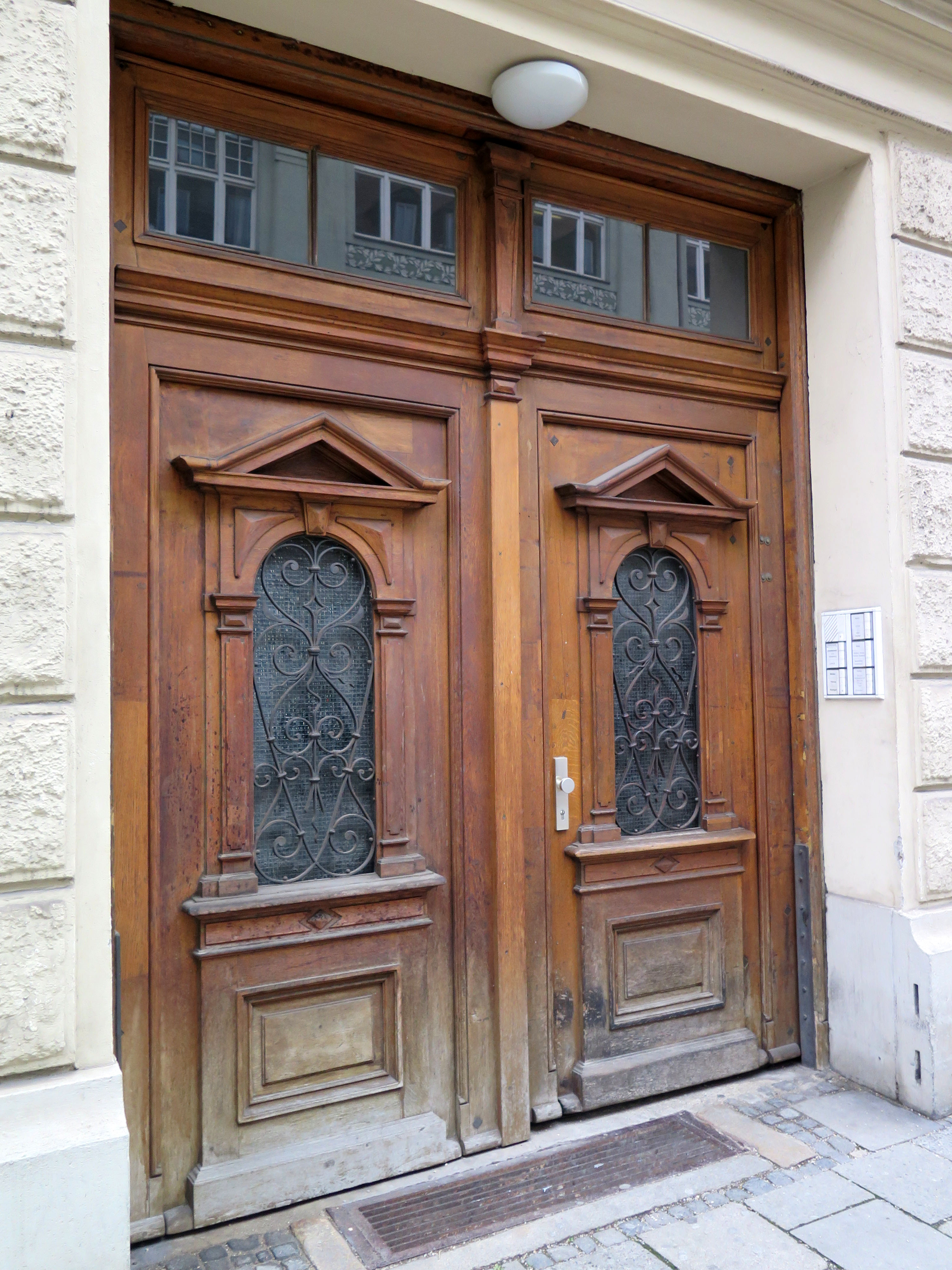
Double-hinged front door

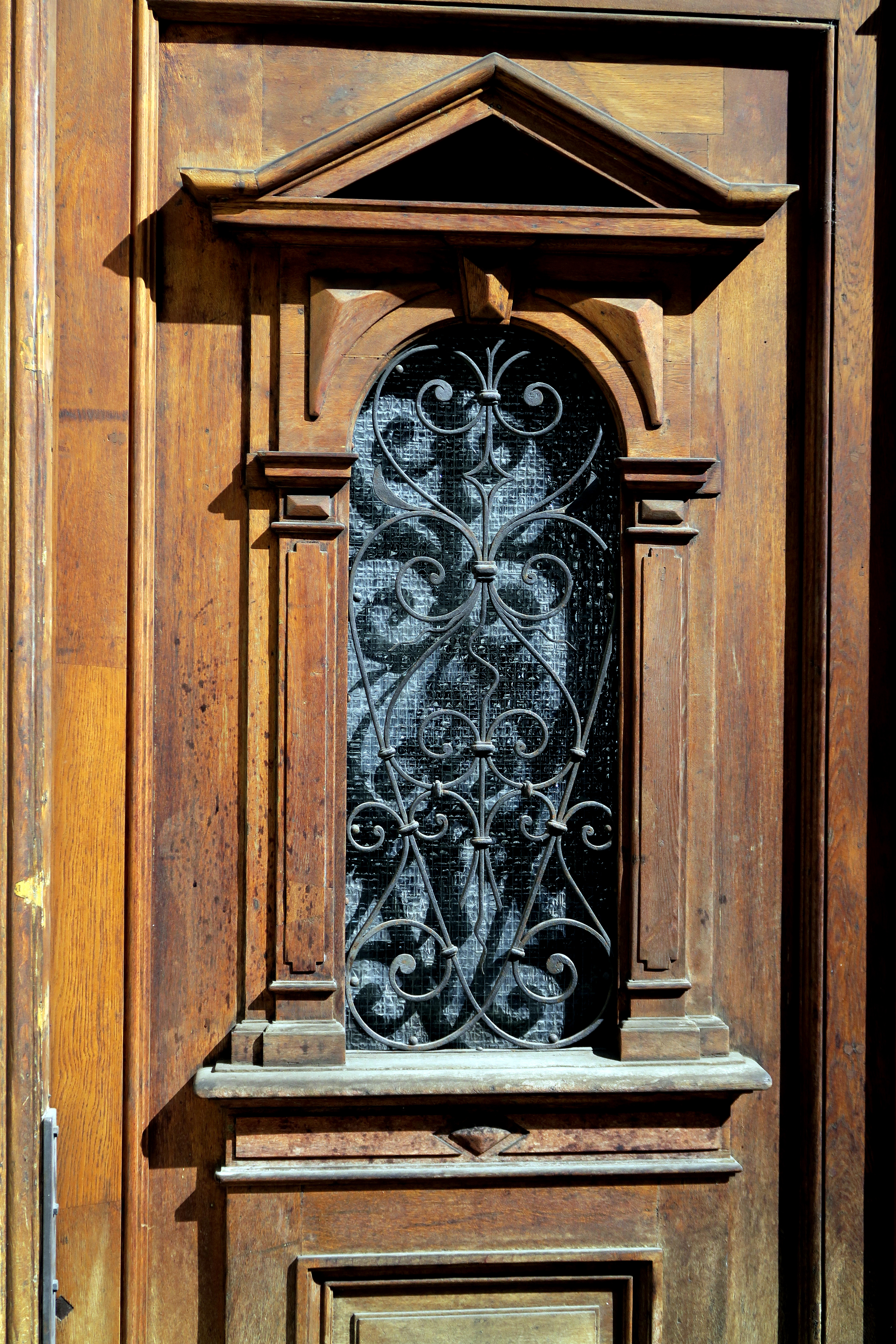
Barred Glass window

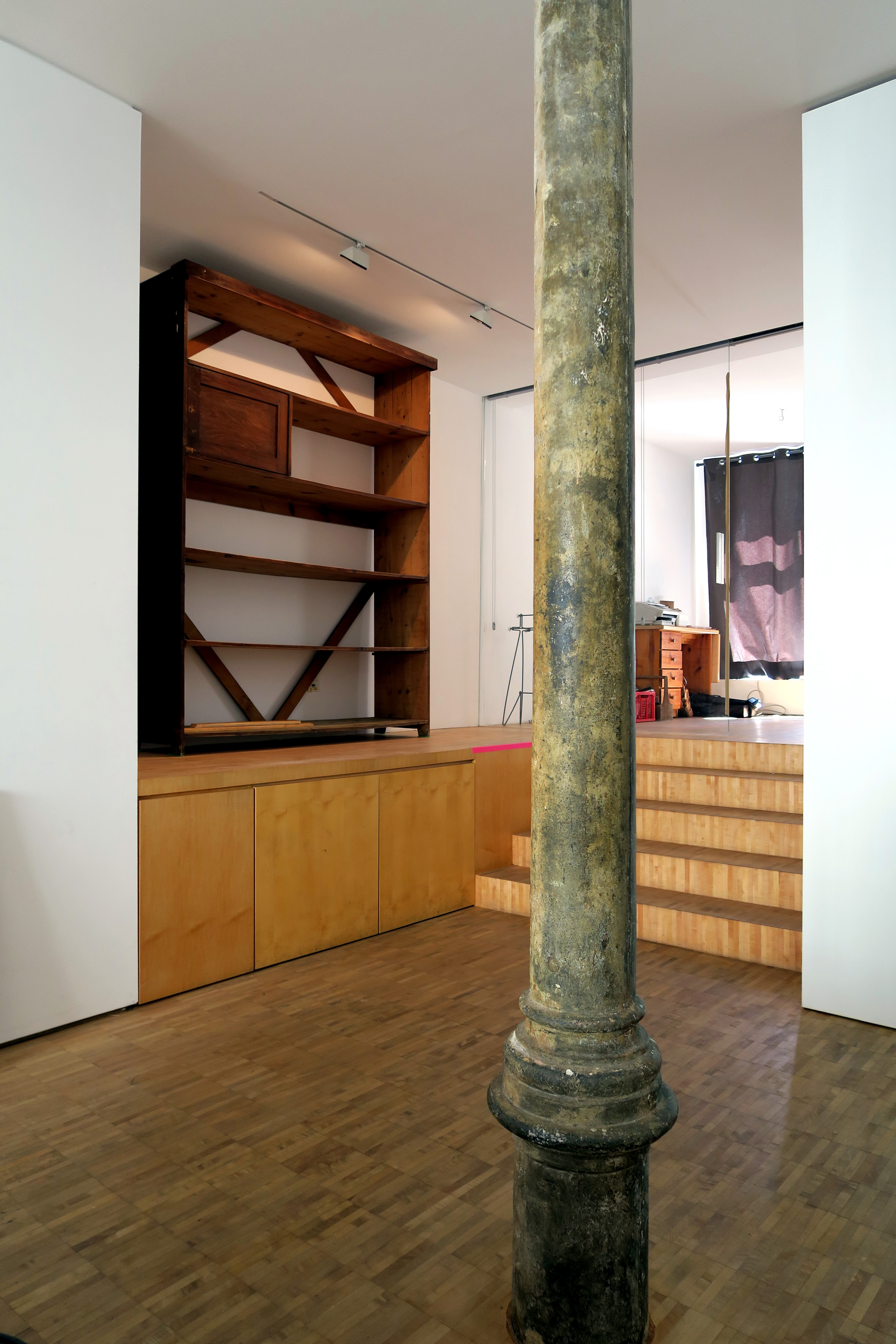
Cast iron support column
