= Martin von Feuerstein =

German painter

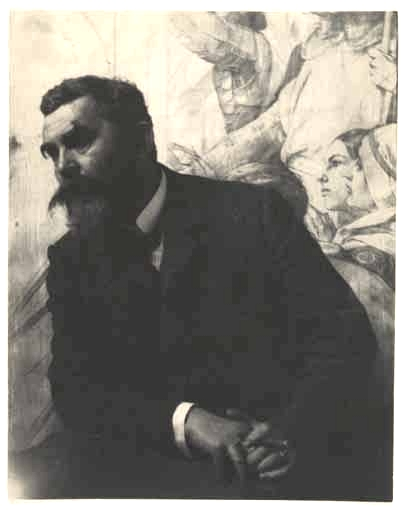
Martin von Feuerstein; photograph by Frank Eugene (1908)

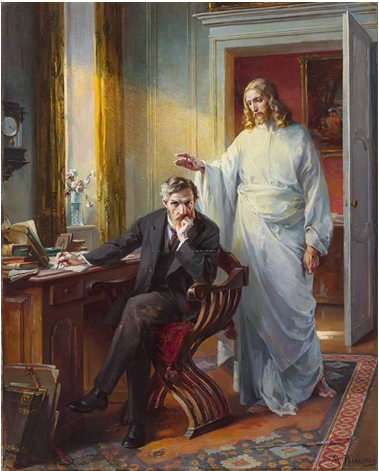
Self-portrait with Apparition of Christ (c.1900)

Martin Feuerstein (after 1914, Martin Ritter von Feuerstein; 6 January 1856 – 13 February 1931) was a German painter and art teacher. He was a late adherent of the Nazarene movement, but was also heavily influenced by impressionism and Art Nouveau.

== Life ==
He was born in Barr. His father, Johann Martin Feuerstein, was a sculptor. By 1870, he was studying in Munich. He moved to Paris in 1878 for further studies with Luc-Olivier Merson, then worked as a painter of genre scenes in Alsace from 1880 to 1882. The following year, he took a study trip to Italy. His experiences there inspired him to devote himself to religious art when he returned to Munich. From 1898 to 1924, he was the Professor of Religious Painting at the Academy of Fine Arts; the last person to hold that chair. Among his best-known students were Theodor Baierl, Joseph Ehrismann, the church painter Josef Wittmann and Leo Götz. Feuerstein died in 1931 in Munich.

In 1914, he was knighted by King Ludwig III of Bavaria. His work can be found in churches throughout Germany and Alsace, as well as in the German Chapel at the Basilica of Saint Anthony of Padua.
