= Rainer Maria Schießler =

German Roman Catholic priest

Ordination history of Rainer Maria Schießler
History
Priestly ordination
- Date: 1987

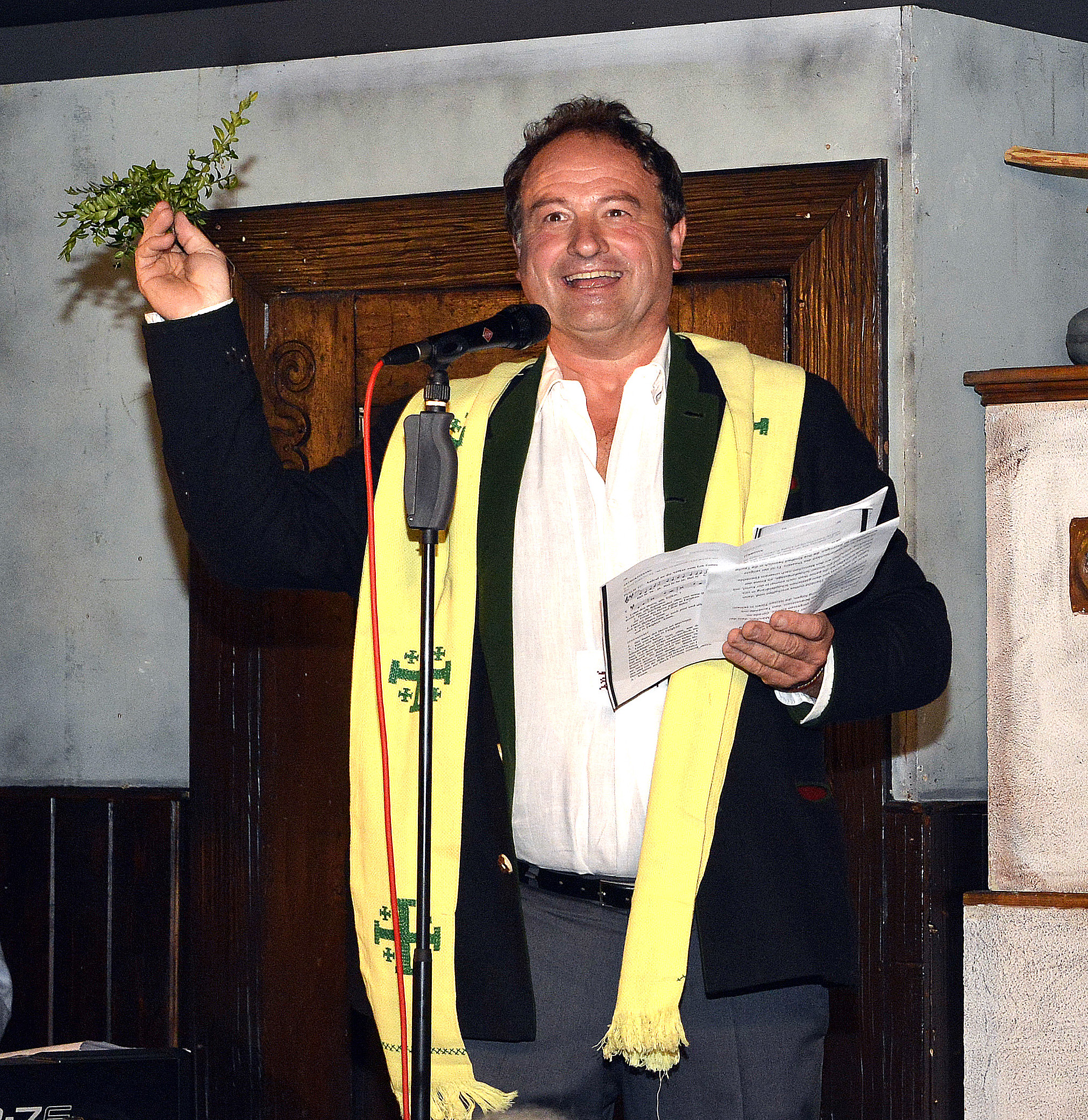
Rainer Maria Schießler

Rainer Maria Schießler (born 7 October 1960 in Munich) is a German Roman Catholic priest. Due to his unconventional style of pastoral ministry and his presence in the media, he is said to be one of the most famous men of the church in Bavaria.

== Life ==
Schießler grew up in the district of the parish "Zu den heiligen zwölf Aposteln" in Munich-Laim. In 1980, he graduated from high school at the Wittelsbacher-Gymnasium München receiving the Bavarian school diploma "Abitur". From 1981 to 1986, he was studying theology at LMU Munich and the University of Salzburg. From 1986 to 1987, he spent a pastoral year in the pastoral unit Bad Kohlgrub. He was ordained to the priesthood on the 27 June 1987 in Freising. From 1987 to 1991, he was chaplain of the church "St. Nikolaus" in Rosenheim. From 1991 to 1993, he was chaplain in church "Heiligkreuz" in Munich-Giesing. Since 1993 he leads as parson the St. Maximilian parish in Munich (he was officially installed in 1995).

From 2006 to 2012, Schießler worked every year in the Schottenhamel-Tent at the Octoberfest in Munich as a waiter. He donated his salary from this job to a charity. After a break of two years he worked in 2015 another time at the Oktoberfest and donated his earnings to a charity project for Syria initiated by the Bavarian comedian Christian Springer.

Since 2011, he is administering besides St. Maximilian parish also the Heilig-Geist parish at the Viktualienmarkt.

Since December 2012, he has had his own Talkshow called Pfarrer Schießler, which is produced and broadcast by Bayerischer Rundfunk.

He often receives public attention for his progressive and often provocative statements for a vital and active church.

== Books ==
- Himmel, Herrgott, Sakrament. Auftreten statt austreten. 2. Auflage. Kösel, Munich 2016, ISBN 978-3-466-37147-1.

== Quotes ==
- „I got to know God better in some bars than in many bible study meetings.“ (translated from German)
