= German Hunting and Fishing Museum =

Museum in Munich, Germany

Coordinates: 48°08′18″N 11°34′16″E

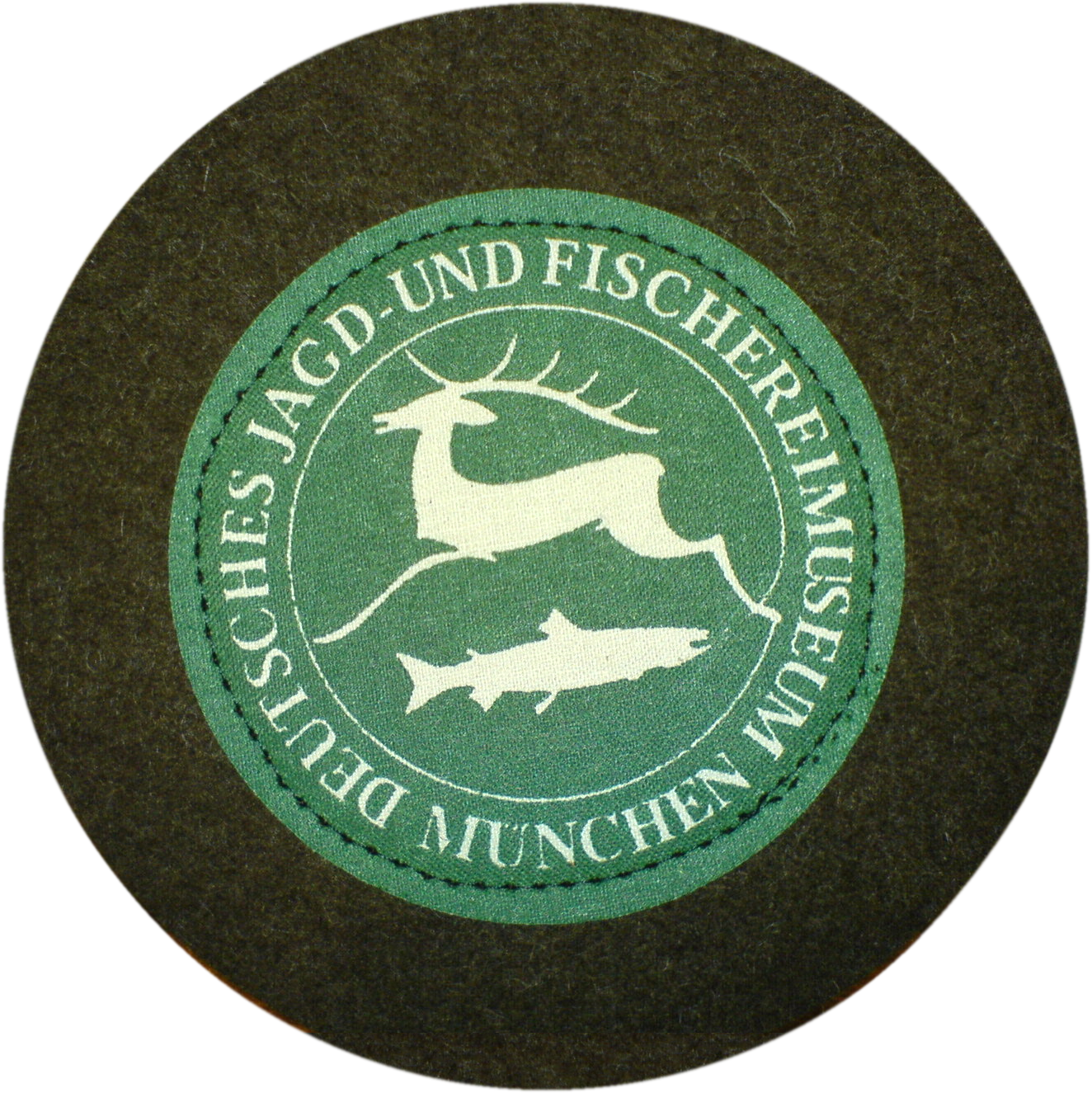
Logo of the Deutsches Jagd- und Fischereimuseum

German Hunting and Fishing Museum, Munich

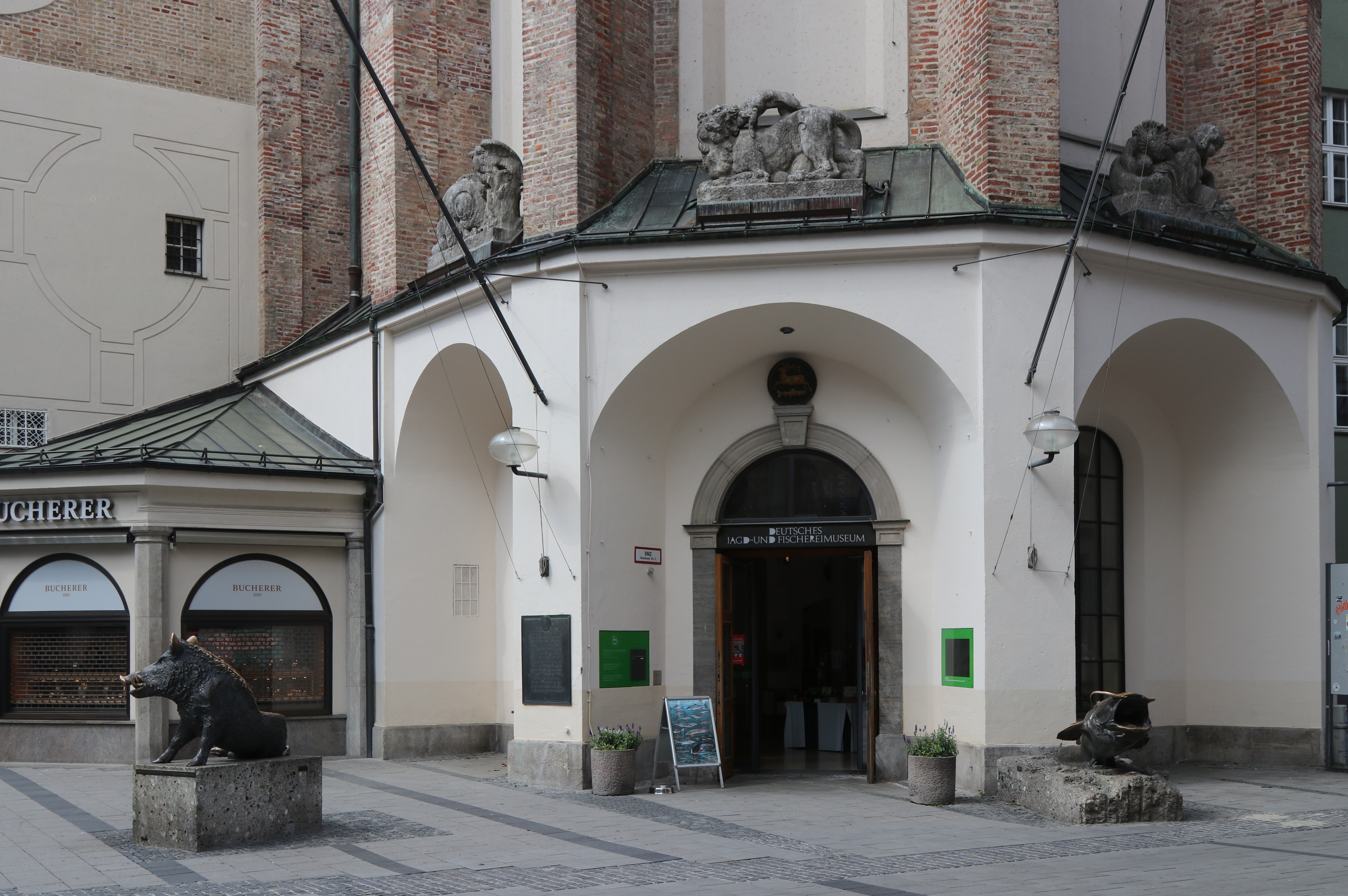
Museum entrance

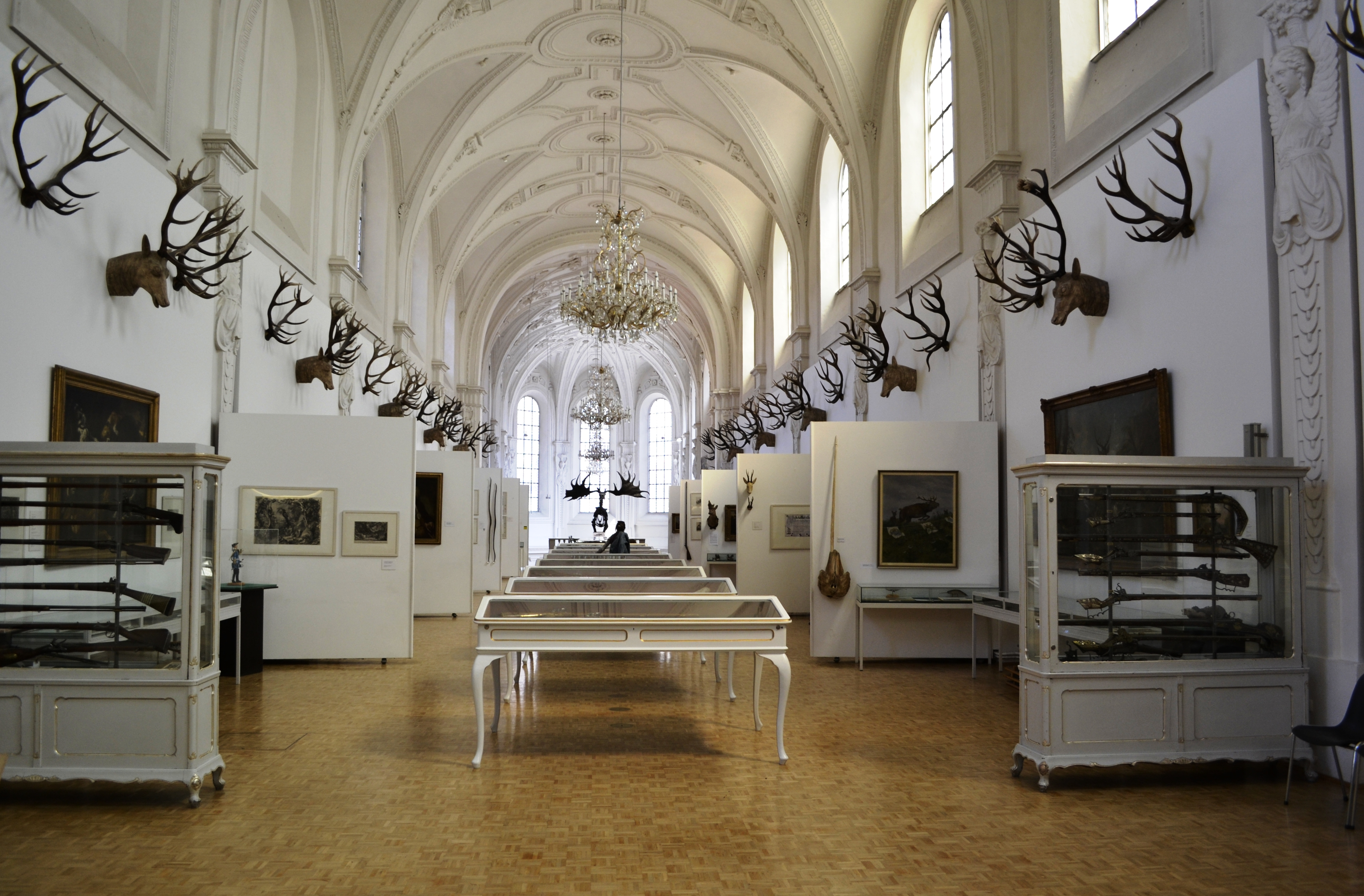
Interior of the museum

The German Hunting and Fishing Museum (German: Deutsches Jagd- und Fischereimuseum) is a museum exhibiting objects connected with the history of hunting and fishing in Germany or other territories which nowadays belong to it.

== Location ==
Located in the pedestrian zone of the city center of Munich, Bavaria, it is a rare institution worldwide. The building was a church (the Augustinian Church) which was part of a large Augustinian monastery between the 13th century and 1803. The museum has a display area of approximately 3,000 square metres (32,000 sq ft).

== History ==
Around 1900, with hunting being at its (last) height of popularity, people asked for a hunting museum. In 1934, the Imperial Hunting Museum (Reichsjagdmuseum) was finally established.

During World War II, most of the objects were saved in Schloßgut Ast near Landshut, Bavaria. All other objects were lost because of looting. After the war, there was a big discussion about the further structure of the Reichsjagdmuseum. In 1958, the year of the 800th anniversary of the founding of the city, the decision in favour of the Augustinian Church was taken. The German Hunting Museum (Deutsches Jagdmuseum) was re-opened on St. Hubert's Day, 3 November 1966.

In 1982, fishing was added as a field of interest, and the museum was renamed the German Hunting and Fishing Museum (Deutsches Jagd- und Fischereimuseum).

== Collection ==
The museum exhibits about 500 wild stuffed animals, including an Irish elk, a cave bear and several endemic freshwater fish. The collection includes fishing tackle, hunting weapons (especially 15th- to 19th-century), and large sledges presenting a time span of several centuries.

Several so-called Wolpertinger creatures, Bavarian fictional animals, are on display.
