= Leo Götz =

German painter

Leonhard "Leo" Götz (1883 – 3 November 1962) was a German painter.

== Biography ==
Born in Weiden in der Oberpfalz, he studied painting and sketching in Nuremberg and Munich. At the Royal Bavarian Academie of Pictorial Arts, where Franz von Stuck was professor at this time, he was fellow of Martin von Feuerstein and Adolf Hengeler, two Art Nouveau artists and well known professors. In 1914 he moved to Hof/Saale. From 1914 to 1918 he joined the German Army and fought at the western front. During that time he painted several postcards for the imperial army. From 1918 until 1962 he lived in Hof/Saale, where he died on 3 November 1962.

His most famous works have been the decoration of the church of St. Mary in Hof/Saale in 1925, the war memorials at the chapel of Marlesreuth, the paintings for the entrance hall at the former Panda shoe manufacture in Naila.

== See also ==
- List of German painters
