= Joseph Ehrismann =

French-German painter and stained glass maker (1880–1937)

- Born: March 2, 1880; Mutzig, German Empire
- Died: February 18, 1937 (aged 56); Strasbourg, France
- Education: Kunstgewerbeschule Straßburg; Akademie der Bildenden Künste München
- Known for: Stained glass windows
- Style: Eclecticism, Art Nouveau, Art Deco
- Awards: Gold medal at the 1925 International Exhibition of Modern Decorative and Industrial Arts, Paris, France; Chevalier de l'Ordre des Palmes académiques

Joseph Ehrismann (1880–1937) was a painter and master stained glass maker from Alsace. He was born as a German citizen in Alsace-Lorraine, and died as a French citizen in Bas-Rhin, without having substantially left his home region.

The son of a Catholic baker from the small town of Mutzig, he studied from 1906 to 1912 in Strasbourg with Auguste Cammissar, and in Munich with Martin von Feuerstein (who hailed from the small town of Barr, very close to Mutzig). Having obtained the title of Meisterschüler, Ehrismann then established his own workshop, providing stained-glass windows for a number of churches and public institutions across Alsace, but also some murals.

Many of Ehrismann's creations have been destroyed during World War II, or due to fires having gutted the churches, but a number of them can still be seen in situ in Strasbourg, Mulhouse, Colmar, Schiltigheim, Bischheim, Molsheim, Meistratzheim, Lampertsloch, Betschdorf, and Weitbruch.

== Gallery ==
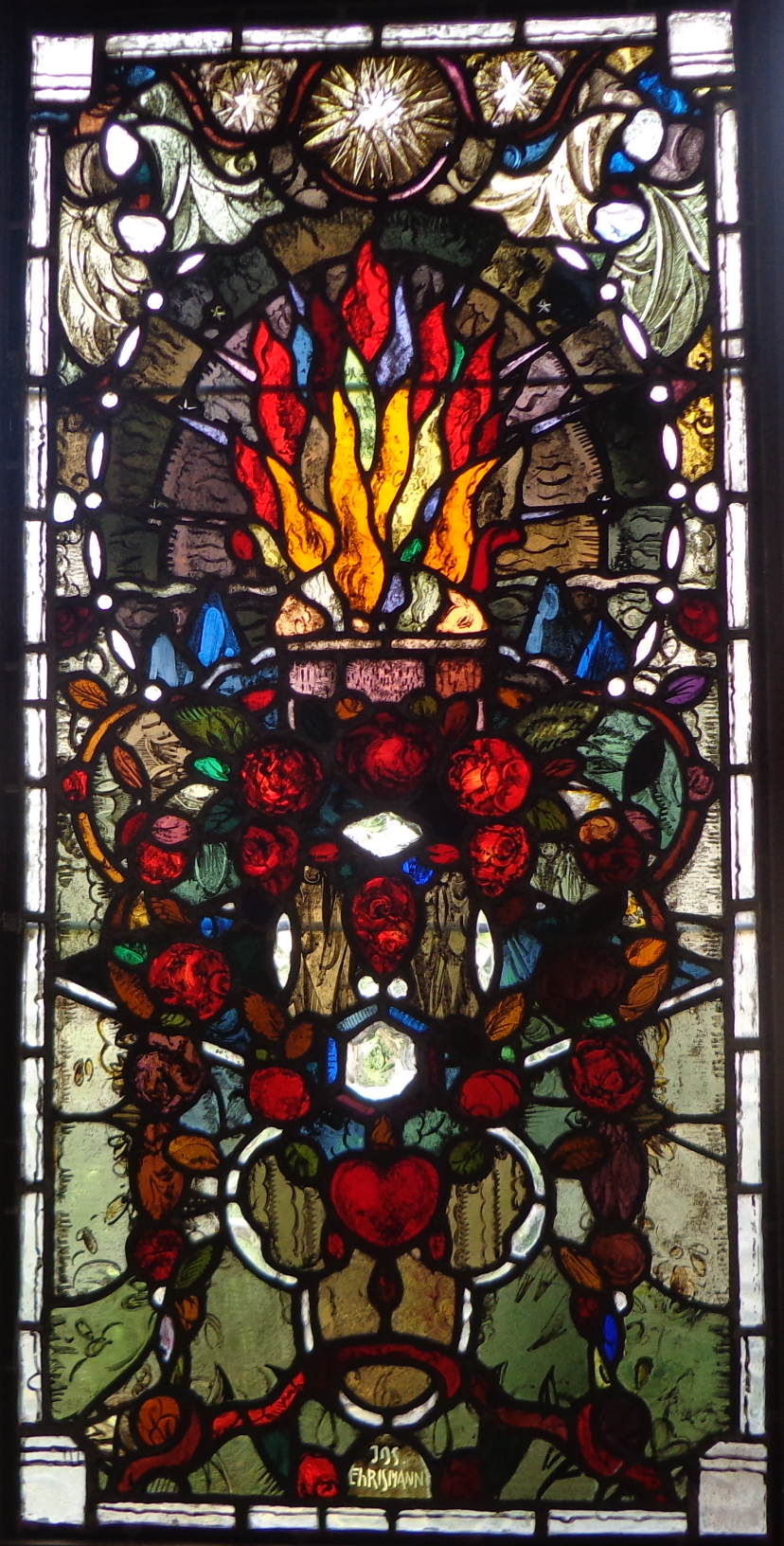
Window signed "Jos. Ehrismann" (Musée de la Chartreuse, Molsheim)

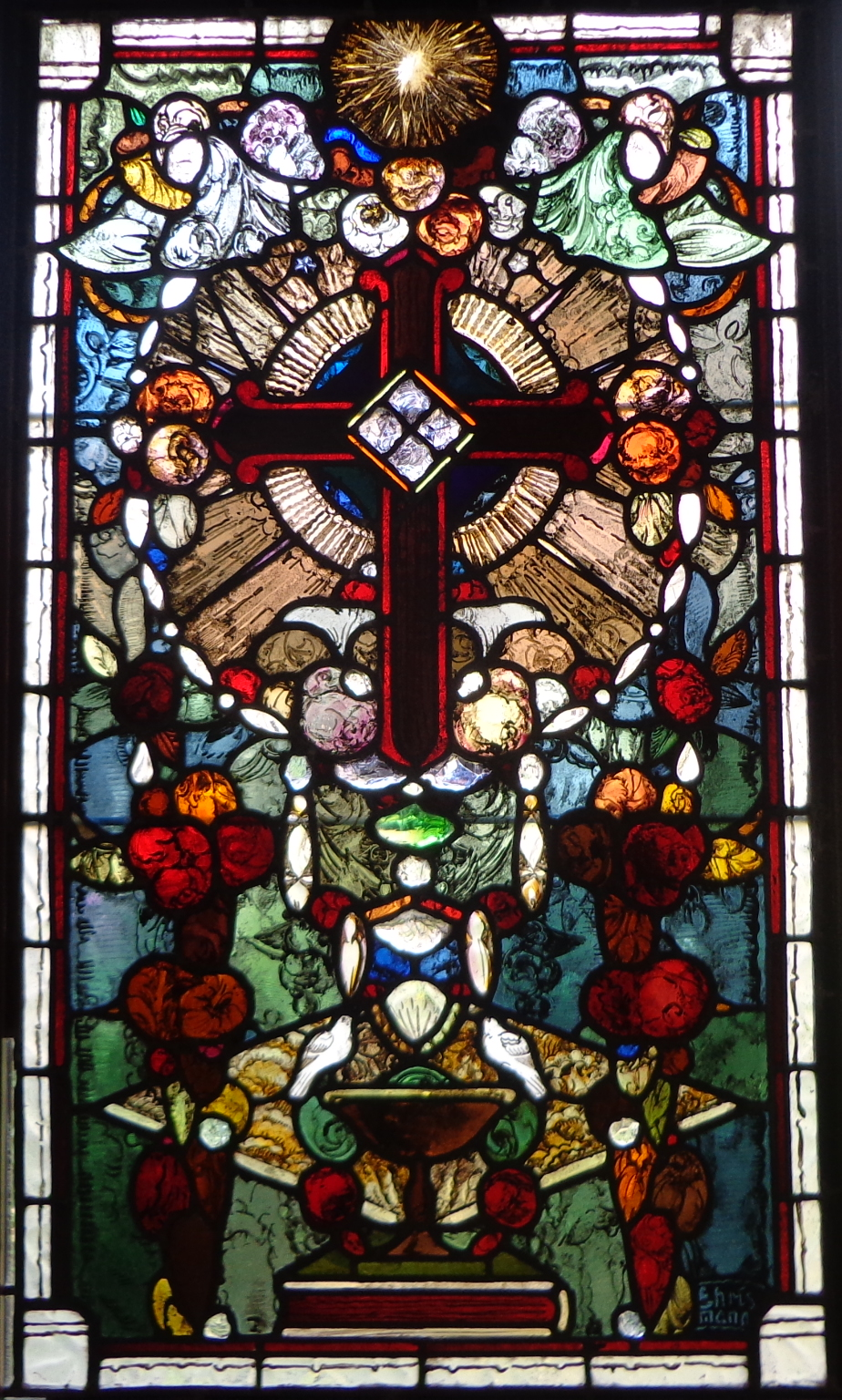
Window signed "Ehrismann" (same location)

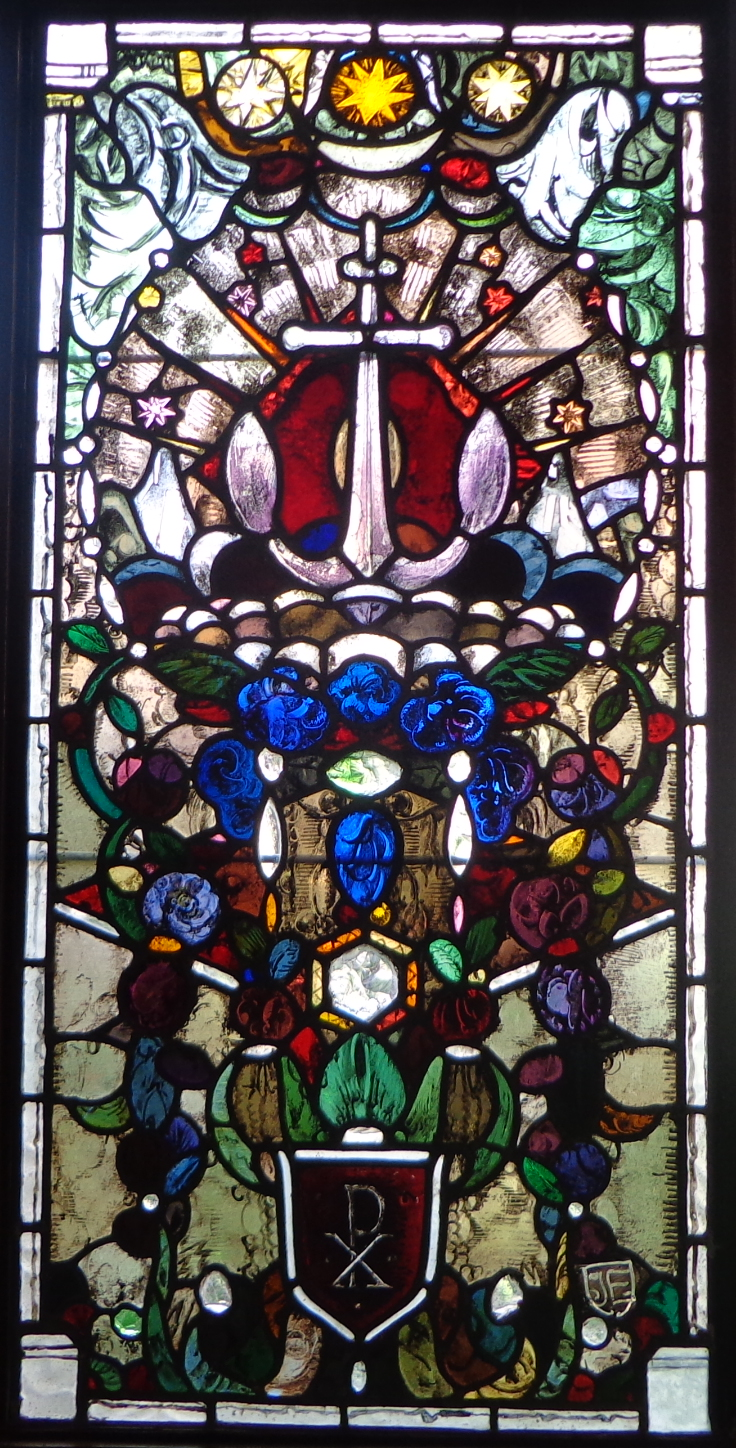
Window signed "JE" (id.)

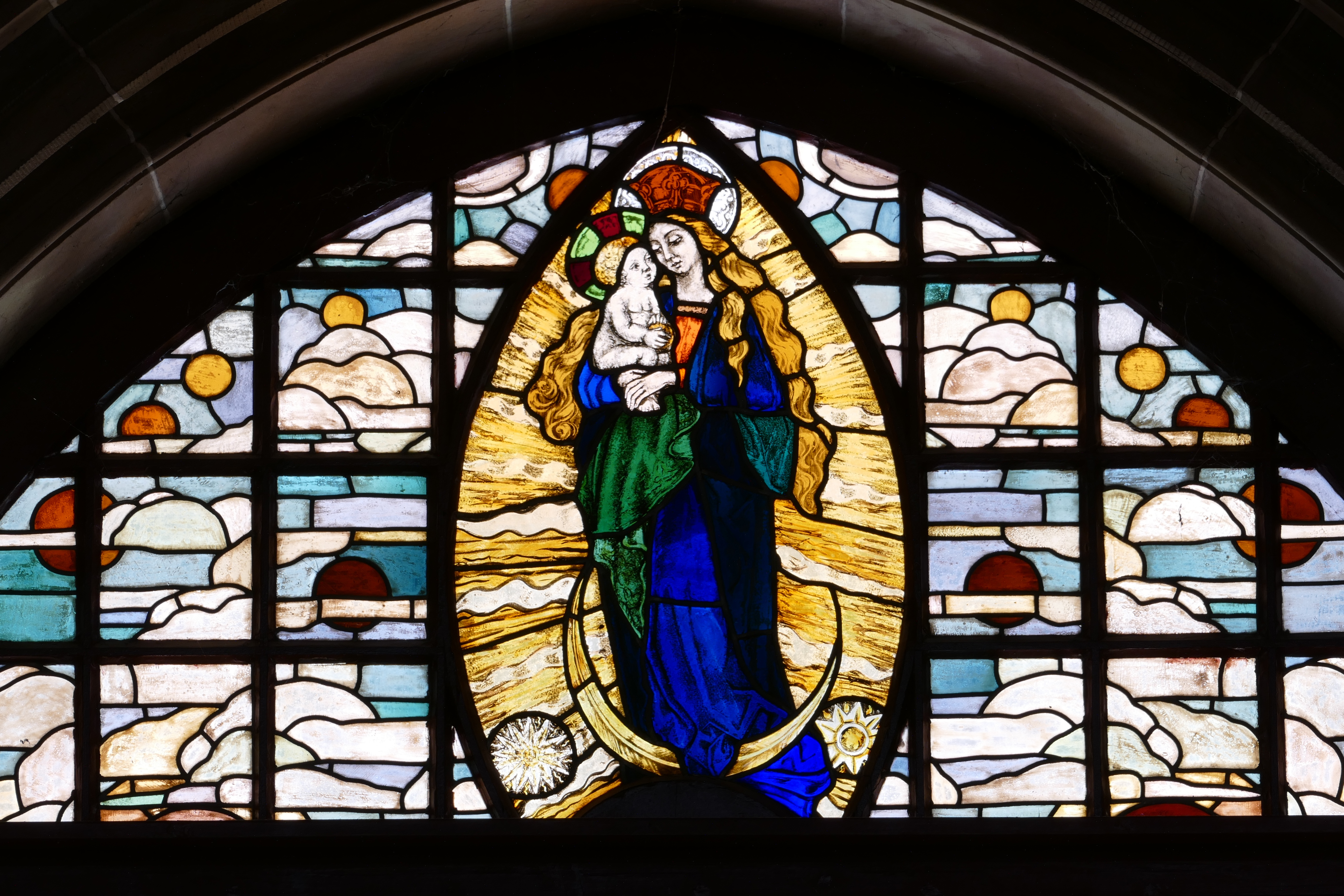
Madonna and Child (Meistratzheim, Église Saint-André)

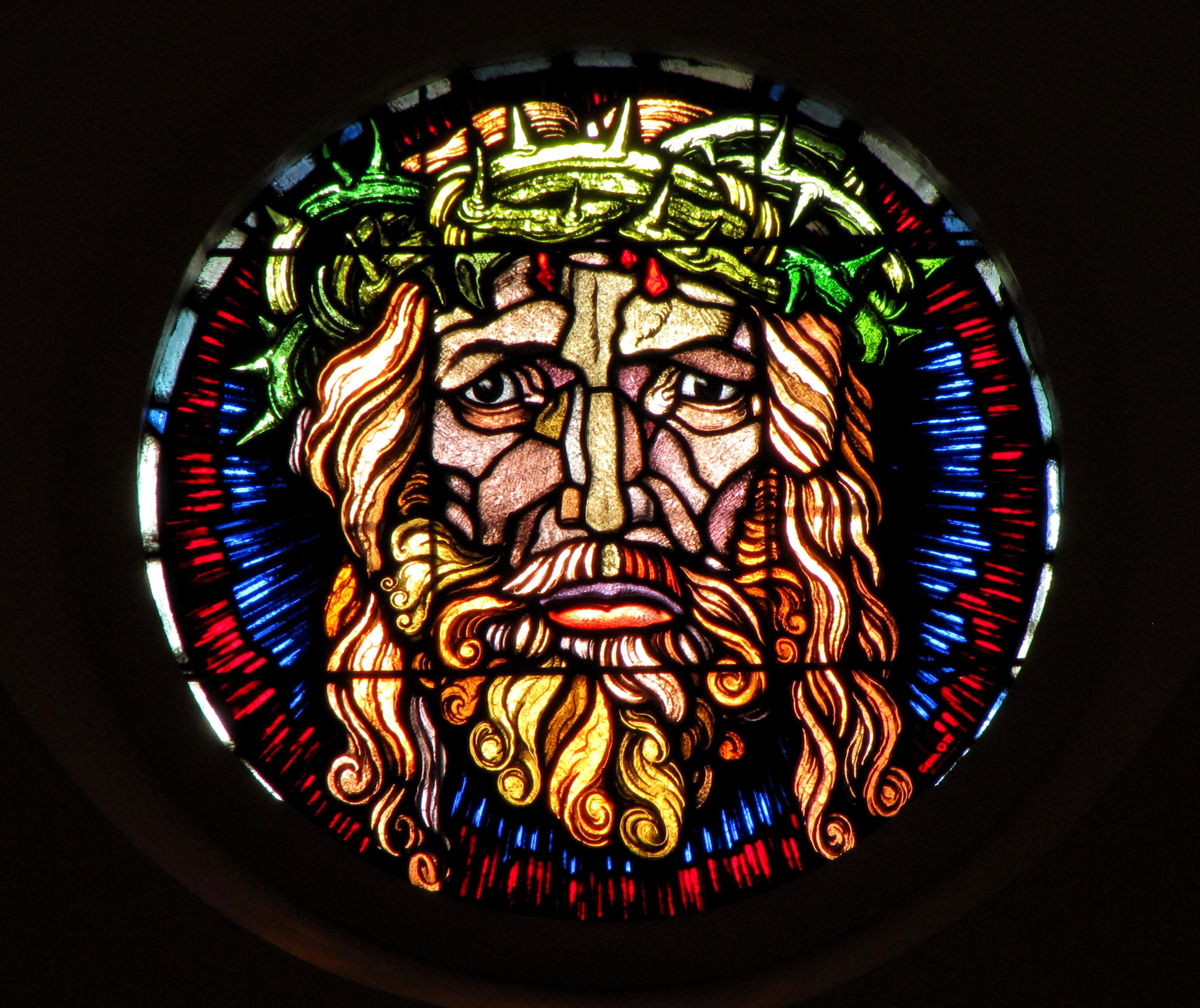
Man of Sorrows (Bischheim, Protestant church)

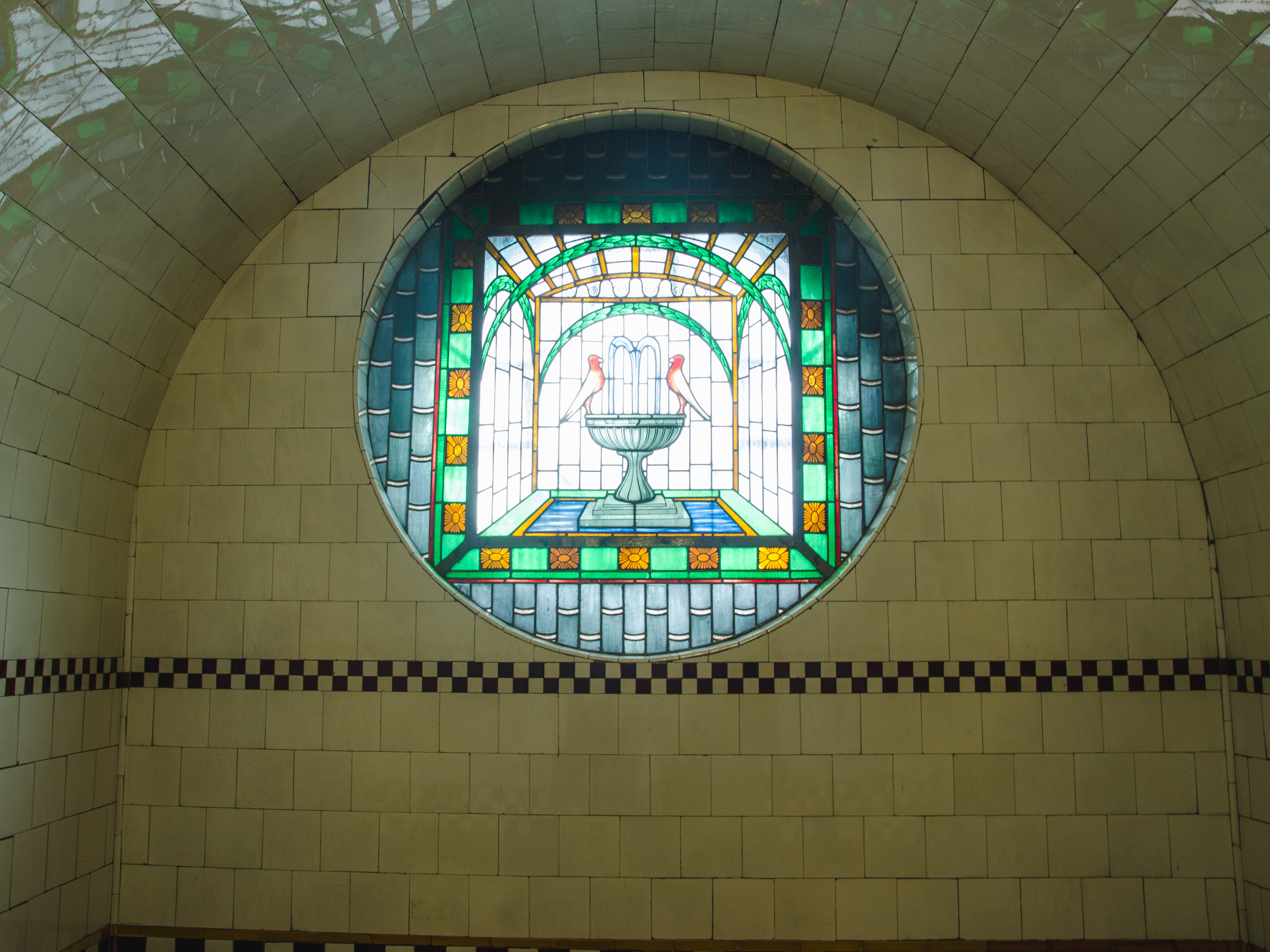
Birds on a fountain (Bains municipaux de Strasbourg)
