= St. Anna im Lehel =

Church building in Munich, Germany

Coordinates: 48°08′25″N 11°35′14″E

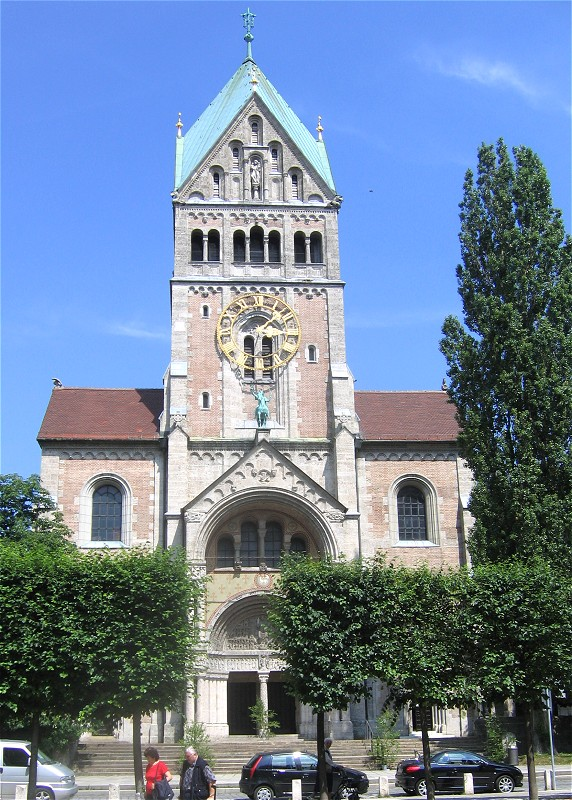
Parish Church of St Anna, Lehel, Munich

St. Anna im Lehel is a parish of the Roman Catholic Church in the Lehel district of Munich. Founded in 1808, it is staffed by Franciscans from the adjacent abbey of St. Anna.

The historic parish church was constructed between 1887 and 1892 in Romanesque Revival by Gabriel von Seidl. It is the main parish church of Lehel, located in the center of the quarter, and situated opposite of the Abbey Church of St Anna.
