= Klosterkirche St. Anna im Lehel =

Church in Munich

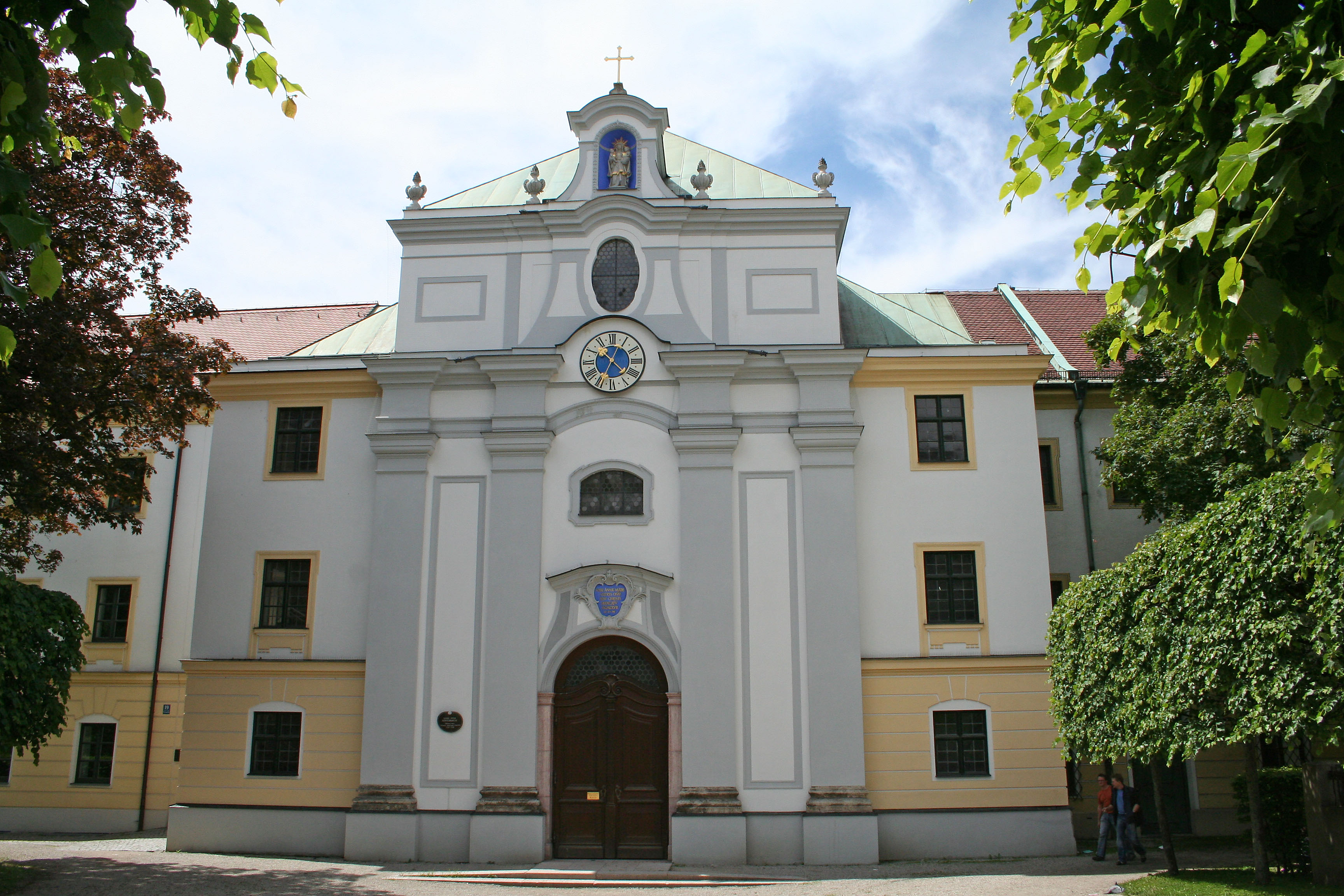
- Klosterkirche St. Anna im Lehel
- 48°08′24″N 11°35′9″E
- Country: Germany
- Denomination: Catholic
- Website: www.st-anna-muenchen.de

Architecture
- Architectural type: Abbey
- Style: Rococo

Klosterkirche St. Anna im Lehel is a Catholic abbey church in Munich, Germany. It was the first Rococo church of Old Bavaria and shaped the development of religious architecture in Bavaria. It is located in the center of Lehel opposite to the neo-romanesque Catholic parish church of St. Anna im Lehel.

== Architecture ==
The architect was Johann Michael Fischer and the interior decoration was done by Cosmas Damian Asam, Egid Quirin Asam und Johann Baptist Straub. The work started in 1727 as a gesture of thanks for the birth of the heir to the Bavarian crown, Maximilian III Joseph. The building blended for the first time longitudinal and central construction into a new type.

Fischer thus broke with one of his early masterpieces the established formal language of the architecture of his time. During the Second World War, particularly in April 1944, the church was bombed and later rebuilt without the neo-romanesque additions of the 19th century including the spires which had been added to fit the opposite parish church. Instead, Fischer's facade was reconstructed in 1968 by Erwin Schleich but moved forward where once the neo-romanesque front was placed.
