= Augustinian Church, Munich =

Augustinian Church
- Augustinerkirche
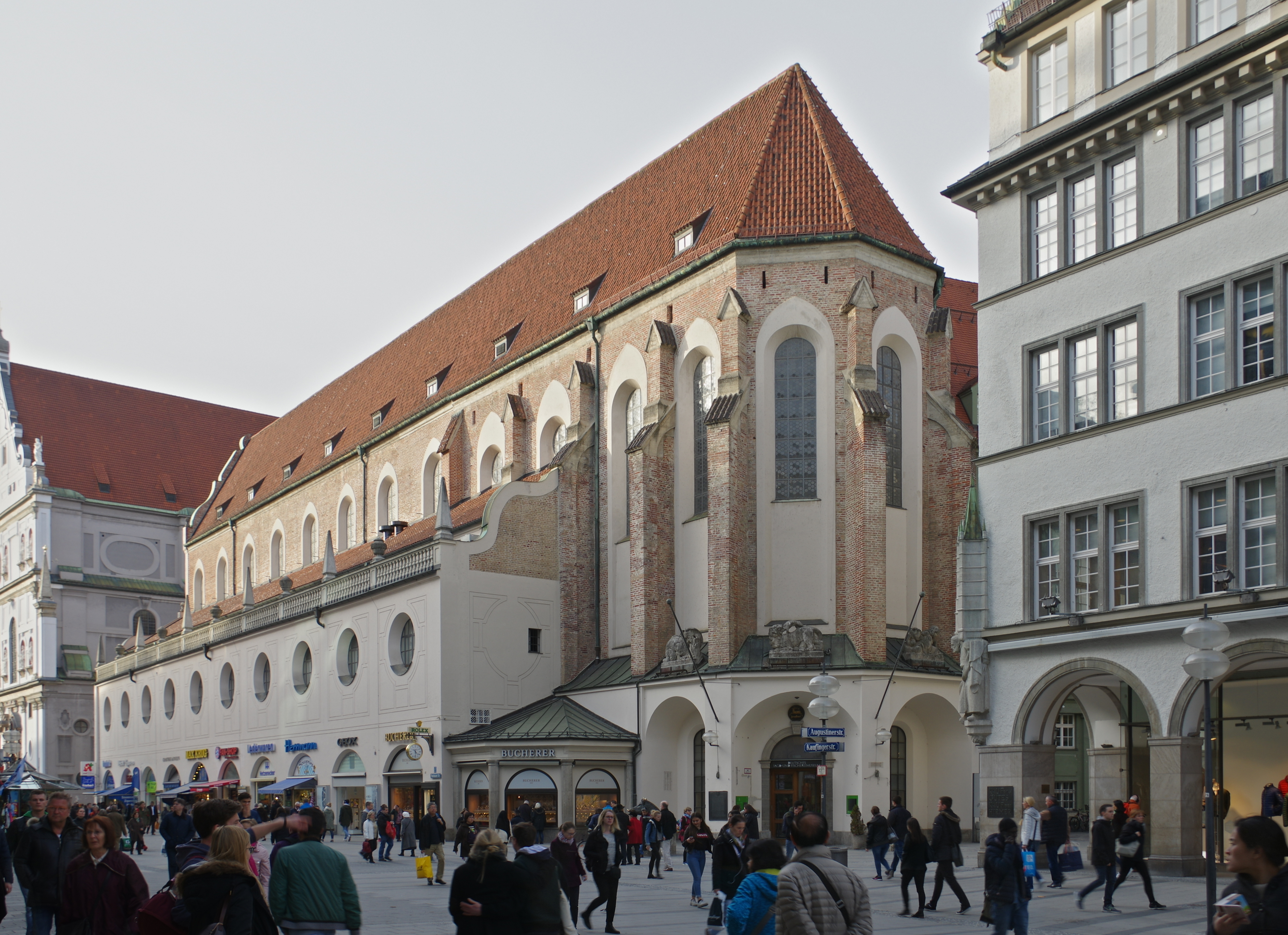
- Augustinian Church
- 48°08′18″N 11°34′16″E
- Country: Germany
- Denomination: Catholic

Architecture
- Architectural type: Abbey

The Augustinian Church (German: Augustinerkirche), also called the Augustinian Abbey (Augustinerkloster) or Abbey Church of St John the Baptist and John the Evangelist (Klosterkirche St. Johannes der Täufer und Johannes der Evangelist) is a former church in Munich, Germany. Constructed during the 13th century and expanded during the next two centuries, it was the Abbey Church of the Augustinian hermits in the city.

== History ==
The basilica was originally in the Gothic style. It was remodeled to Baroque style from 1618-21 by Veit Schmidt, using plans created by Hans Krumpper. The church belonged for many years to the Augustinian monastery. The monastery building is now used as the offices of the police headquarters in Munich.

In 1803 the abbey was dissolved, and the church was deconsecrated. The church was first used as a toll hall. In 1911 Theodor Fischer built, in the space formerly occupied by the nave, the so-called "White Hall". The church was damaged during World War II. It was rebuilt from 1962 to 1964 by Erwin Schleich to house the Deutsches Jagd- und Fischereimuseum (German Hunting and Fishing Museum).

== Notable residents ==
Johann von Staupitz was elected as the prior of the Abbey in 1503. He was the monastic superior, teacher, and confessor of Martin Luther.
