= St. Maximilian, Munich =

Roman Catholic parish church in Munich, Germany

Coordinates: 48°07′36″N 11°34′25″E

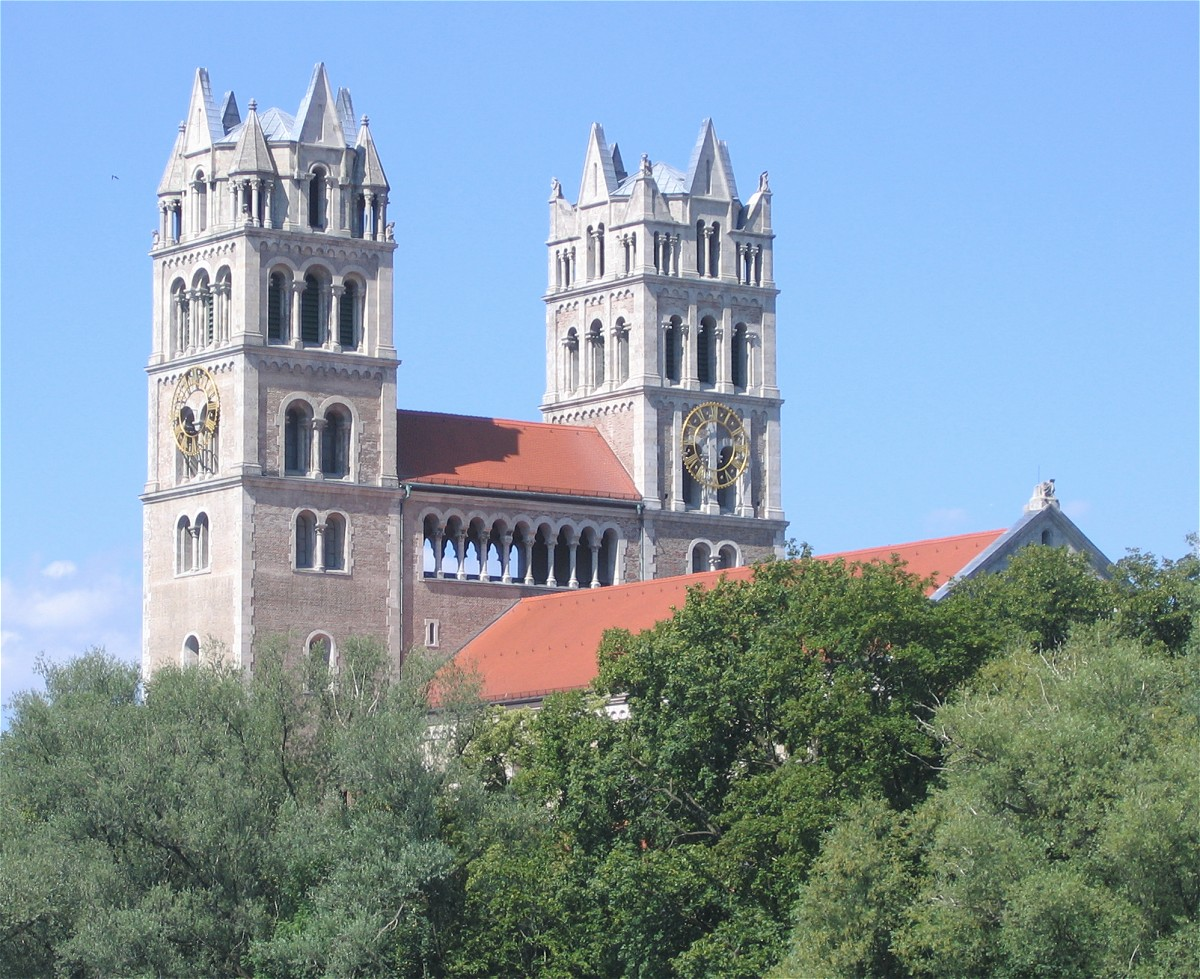
St. Maximilian's church, Isar, Munich

St. Maximilian is a Roman Catholic parish church of the Isar suburb in Munich, southern Germany. It was built from 1892 to 1908 under design by Heinrich von Schmidt in the Romanesque Revival style. St. Maximilian is located on the banks of the Isar, facing the tower of the Deutsches Museum. The current Parish Priest is Fr Rainer Maria Schießler.
