= Altstadt-Lehel =

Borough of Munich, Germany

Coordinates: 48°08′10″N 11°34′20″E

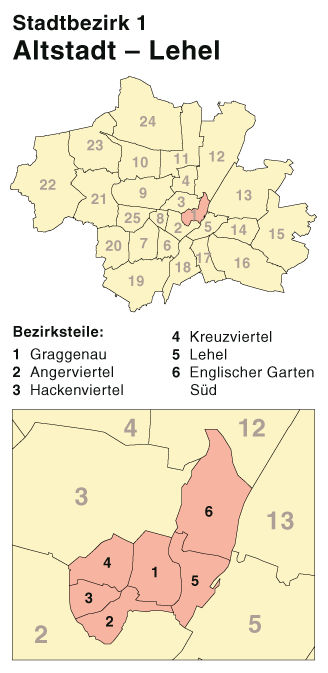
Position of Altstadt-Lehel in Munich

Altstadt (German pronunciation: [ˈaltˌʃtat], lit. 'old town'; Central Bavarian: Oidstod) and Lehel (German pronunciation: [ˈlɛxl̩]; Central Bavarian: Lechl) are districts of the German city of Munich. Together they form the first borough of the city: Altstadt-Lehel.

== Location ==
The borough covers the historical area of Altstadt (as defined by the Altstadtring) and the Lehel area, which is attached to Altstadt via the north east. It also covers the Isar in the east and the Englischer Garten as well as Prinzregentenstraße, bordering it in the north.

== History and description ==
=== Altstadt ===
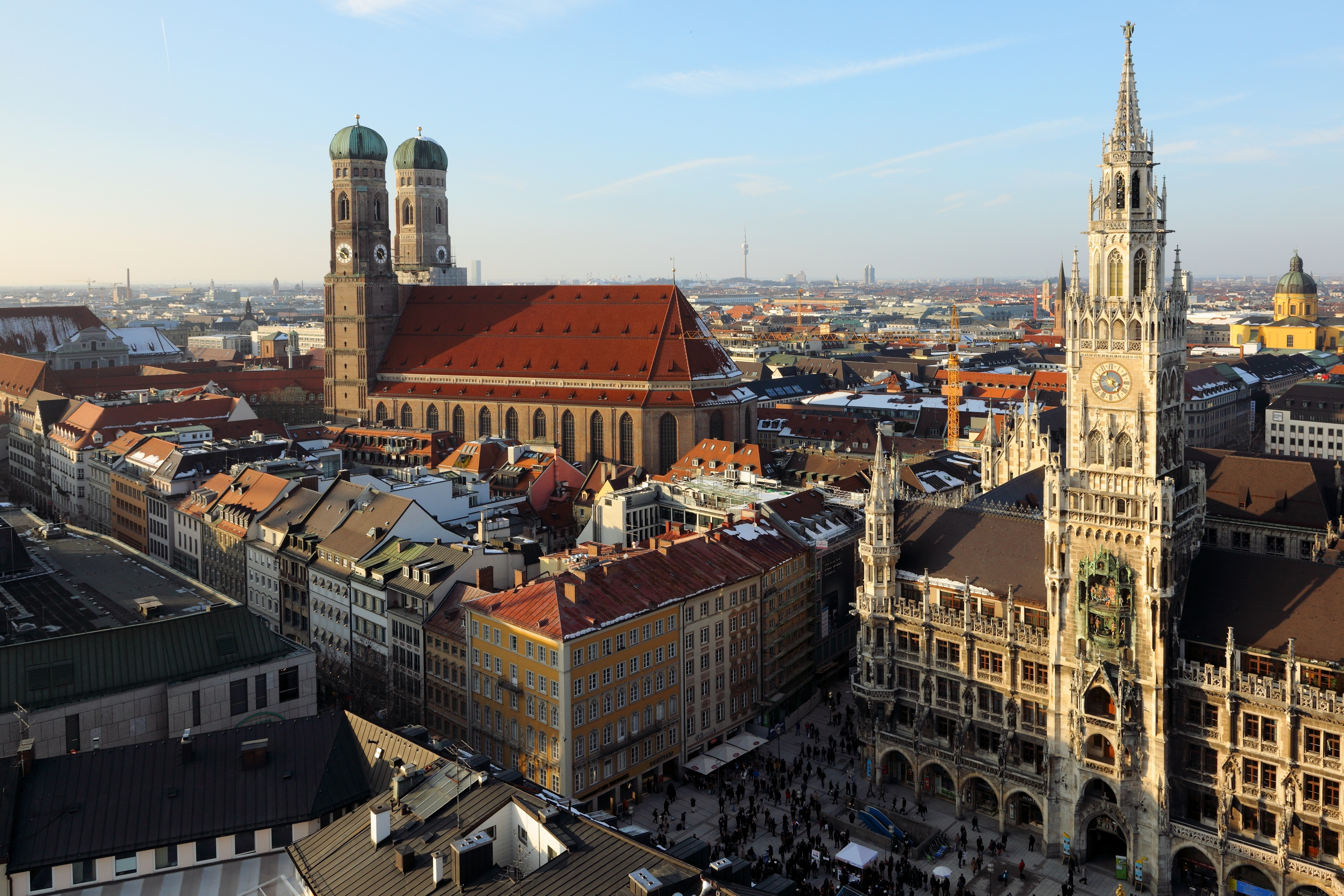
Altstadt

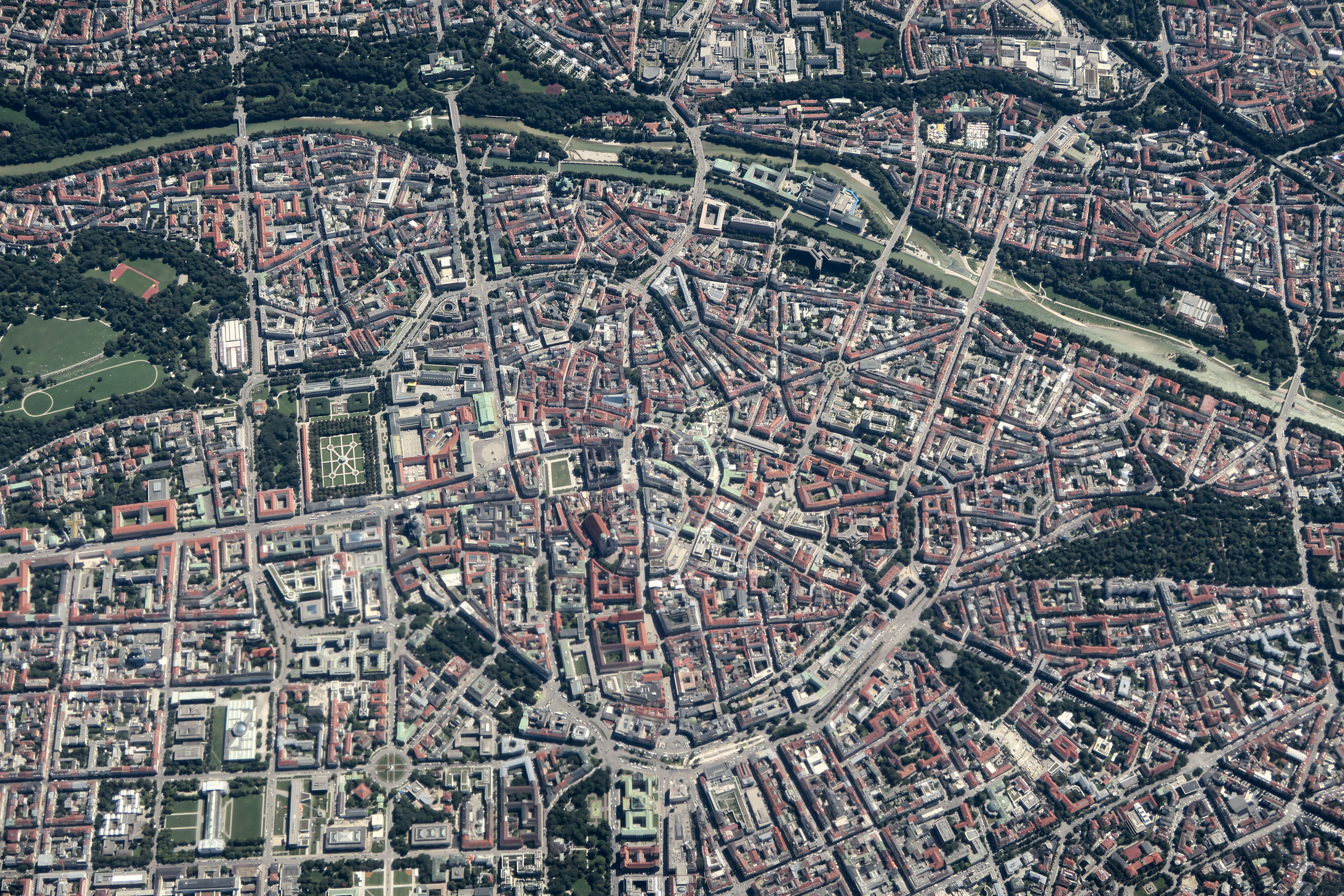
Aerial image of Altstadt-Lehel

Since the town extension via Ludwig the Bavarian lasting from 1285 until 1347, Altstadt consisted of four quarters and an open locale:

- The Kreuzviertel in the north west of Altstadt. Its borders are described roughly as Kaufingerstraße/Neuhauser Straße in the south and Weinstraße/Theatinerstraße in the east. Located here was the centre of the clergy as there was a particularly high number of monasteries. The Kreuzviertel which was first mentioned via documents on 29 December 1458 is named after the Kreuzgasse: a street that today roughly corresponds to the Promenadenplatz and the Pacellistraße. The origin of the name is unclear. Other name: Eremitenviertel.
- The Graggenauer Viertel in the north east of Altstadt. Its borders are described roughly as Tal in the south and Dienerstraße in the west. The gentry preferred to reside here, probably because of the proximity to the Alten Hof. This town quarter was first mentioned on 29 December 1458. The name of the Graggenauer Quarter derives from Graggenau, which in turn has its root in the word "Krack", meaning Raven or Crow. Alternative name is Wilbrechts-Viertel, after the first Viertelhauptmann (translates as "quarter captain"). Until into the 16th century the local tax records considered the area outside the wall up to the modern-day Prinzregentenstrasse as part of Graggenau.
- The Angerviertel in the south east of Altstadt. Its borders are described roughly as Tal in the north and Sendlinger Straße in the west. Traders predominantly resided here. First mention via documentation of the area is veritable as of 15 September 1508. The name Anger (meaning Meadow, however with a limitation to common land) derives from the meadow which was in domain of the modern-day St. Jakobs Platz with the Münchner Stadtmuseum in the old armoury and the new Jewish centre (Jüdisches Zentrum München). Another name for the district is Rindermarktviertel, after the former cattle market of the city at the site of the Altstadt on which the Rindermarktbrunnen, sculptured in 1964 by Josef Hensel, is a reminder of the former significance of the area.
- The Hackenviertel in the south west of Altstadt. Its borders are described roughly as Kaufingerstraße/Neuhauserstraße in the north and Sendlinger Straße in the south. Traders also predominantly resided here. The name was first documented on 29 December 1458. On Altheimer Eck (Corner/Nook of Altheim) in the Hackenviertel was the area of Altheim, which was included into the area via the defensive wall in around 1285. The name is derived from Hacken, which apart from meaning hoeing or chopping, is also like a closed, fenced-in area. (Compare "Hecke", meaning hedge). Alternative name for Hackenviertel is Kramerviertel.

=== Lehel ===
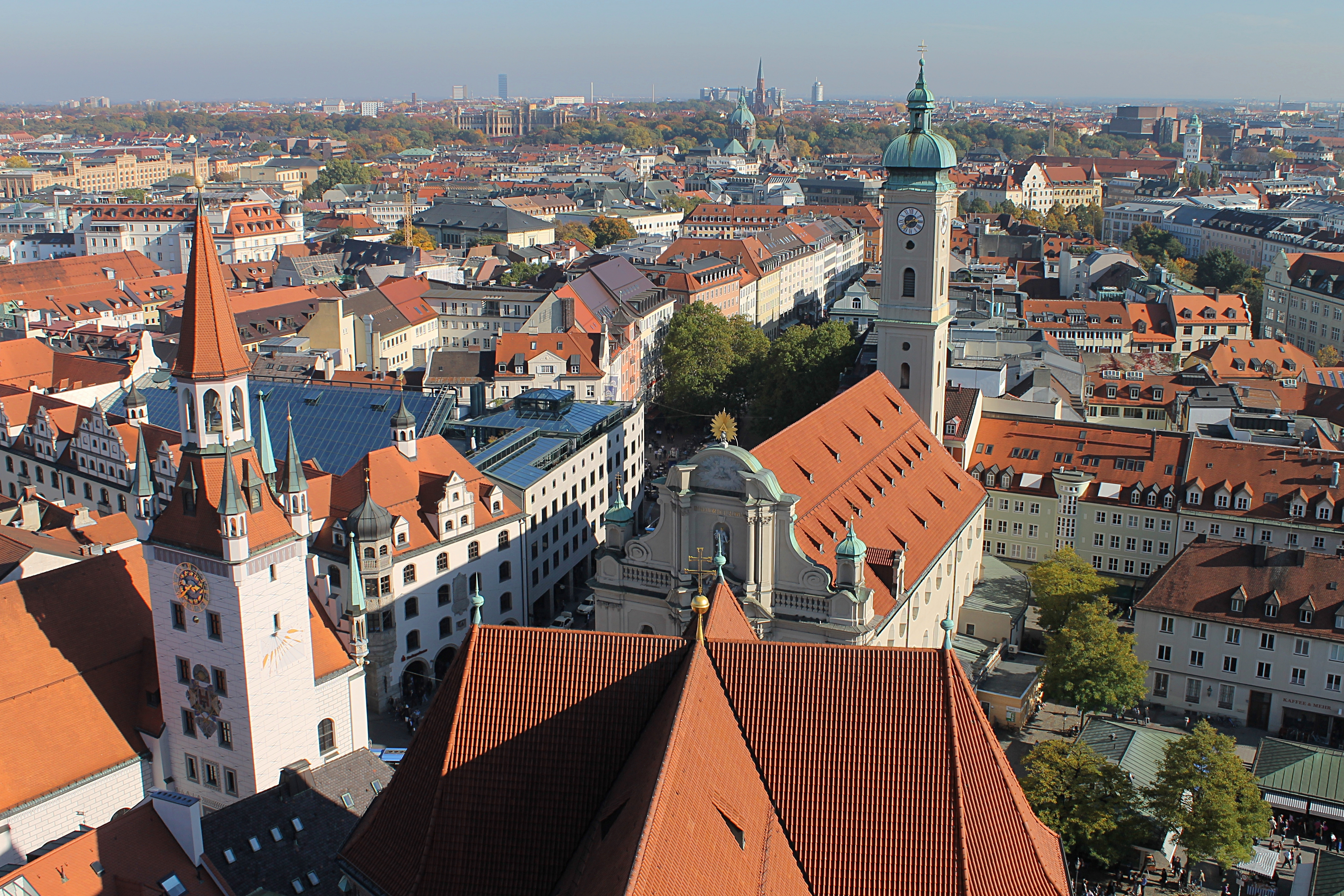
View from Altstadt towards Lehel

==== History ====
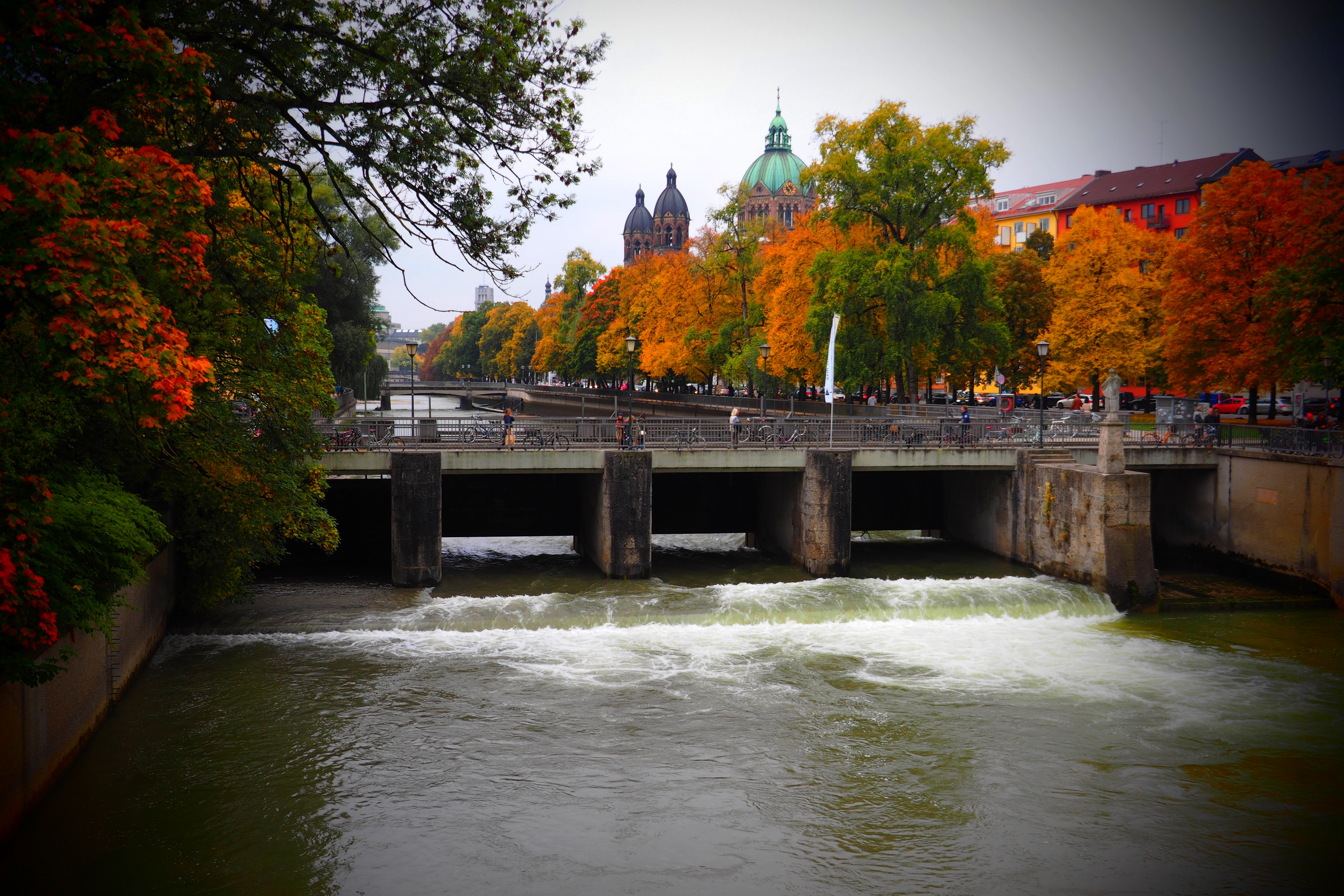
One arm of the Isar river in Lehel

"(The) Lehel" (with locals, the article will never be missing) is regarded "the oldest suburb of Munich"; it was, however, officially incorporated into the city as of 1724 only.

Lehel has become another area for the arts next to the Kunstareal: The State Museum of Ethnology in Maximilianstraße is the second largest collection in Germany of artifacts and objects from outside Europe, while the Bavarian National Museum and the adjoining State Archeological Collections in Prinzregentenstrasse rank among Europe's major art and cultural history museums. The nearby Schackgalerie is an important gallery of German 19th-century paintings.

The quarter, having been one of Munich's surrounding poor houses in times of old, began to turn into today's much sought-after and very expensive residential area beginning with the construction of the first Wilhelminian style apartment houses at the turn of the 20th century and latest after the start of heavy gentrification during the 1980s.

==== Origin of the name ====
There are many theories for the origin of the name of this area.

The more commonly represented indicates to a connection with the name "Lohe", Central and Upper German for a more or less dwindling alluvial forest and/or a light grove intermingled with shrubbing/coppice. Growing predominantly on a ground made up of gravel with heath upon it, it used to be found all around historic Munich from the west to the river Isar in the north-east on the Munich gravel plain. It meets with many locations and its remainders can still be found in the spot from Aubing to Eching. Many places' names in the area still refer to these forests, for example Auginger Lohe. Angerlohe, Allacher Lohe, Lohhof or Keferloh. Here is the consideration, that the pharyngeally pronounced word Lohe, thus perhaps Loche, adjusted and led Orthography in the course of time for other own place names, for example Lochham or Lochhausen. Hereafter, the Bavarian diminutive Löhel, modernly, if even somewhat crudely spelled "Lehel", refers to a small bit of said alluvial forest. In fact, Lehel used to be an "island" in a geographical sense, as it was surrounded by the river Isar at one side and brooks running alongside and towards the river at the others.

This is congruent with the fact that old inhabitants of the district used to pronounce their district as Lächl, with a long vocal. Only in recent times, firstly in a failed attempt to adapt an Old Bavarian dialect word to Standard German by order of town officials and decision of the local public transport compound and secondly by the many non-native inhabitants having adapted to this and native youngsters no longer commanding the dialect, has the pronunciation shifted towards Lehel as it is written, with a lightly accented e on the first syllable in the first aspirate, and shortly pronounced e in the second syllable.

Another, rarer theory holds the view that Lehel is possibly in regards to an earlier feud ("Lehen) that took place; thus Lehen becoming Lehel through the Bavarian diminutive. The author György Dalos mentions in his book "Hungary in a nutshell" the execution of the Hungarian army commander Lehel in the year 955 at Regensburg and thus this district of Munich was named after this hapless warrior.

== Statistics ==
(as of 31 December, inhabitants with principal residence)

| Year | Inhabitants | of which Foreigners | Area (ha.) | Inhabitants/ha. | Source |
|---|---|---|---|---|---|
| 2000 | 18,374 | 4,219 (23.0%) | 316.36 | 58 | Statistisches Taschenbuch München 2001. pdf-Download |
| 2001 | 18,462 | 4,227 (22.9%) | 316.36 | 58 | Statistisches Taschenbuch München 2002. pdf-Download |
| 2002 | 18,193 | 4,079 (22.4%) | 316.36 | 58 | Statistisches Taschenbuch München 2003. pdf-Download |
| 2003 | 18,159 | 4,178 (23.0%) | 316.35 | 57 | Statistisches Taschenbuch München 2004. pdf-Download |
| 2004 | 18,210 | 4,108 (22.6%) | 316.39 | 58 | Statistisches Taschenbuch München 2005. pdf-Download |
| 2005 | 18,631 | 4,261 (22.9%) | 315.87 | 59 | Statistisches Taschenbuch München 2006. pdf-Download |

In 2004, with an area of 316.39 hectares there yields 58 inhabitants per hectare.

(Statistical Pocket Book of Munich)

== Miscellaneous ==
Houses of Altstadt in a backyard of Widenmayer Street in Lehel, later demolished prior to the construction of and substituted by an insurance trust's giant office building, served as the backdrop of the joiner's workshop in Meister Eder und sein Pumuckl.

== Literature ==
- Helmuth Stahleder: Von Allach bis Zamilapark. Names and historical basic information of the history of Munich and its incorporated suburbs. Stadtarchiv München, ed. München: Buchendorfer Verlag 2001. ISBN 3-934036-46-5
- Horst Feiler: Das Lehel: Die älteste Münchner Vorstadt in Geschichte und Gegenwart, MünchenVerlag 2006, ISBN 3-937090-13-4

== See also ==
- Angertorstraße 3
