= Architecture of Munich =

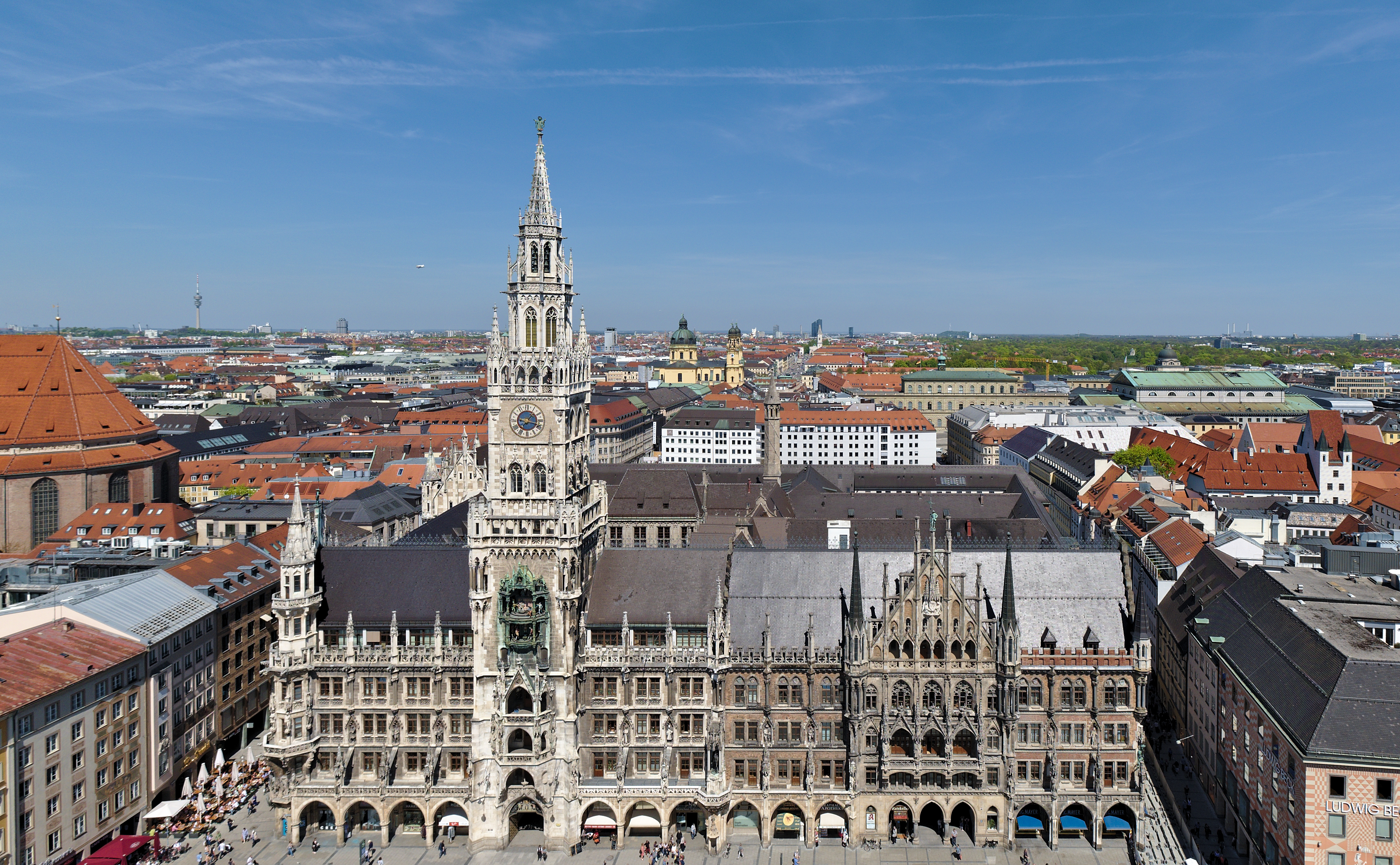
The New Town Hall (2018)

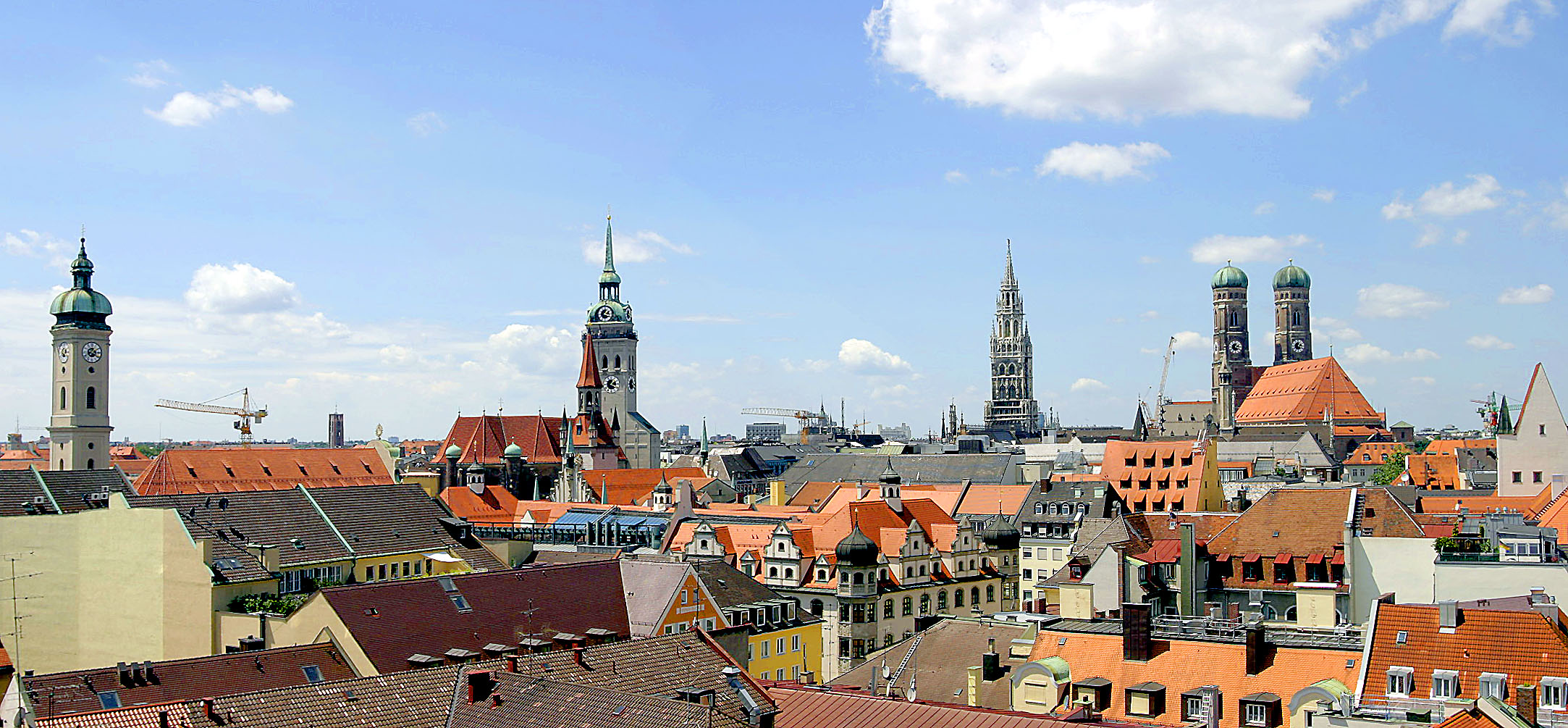
Munich skyline

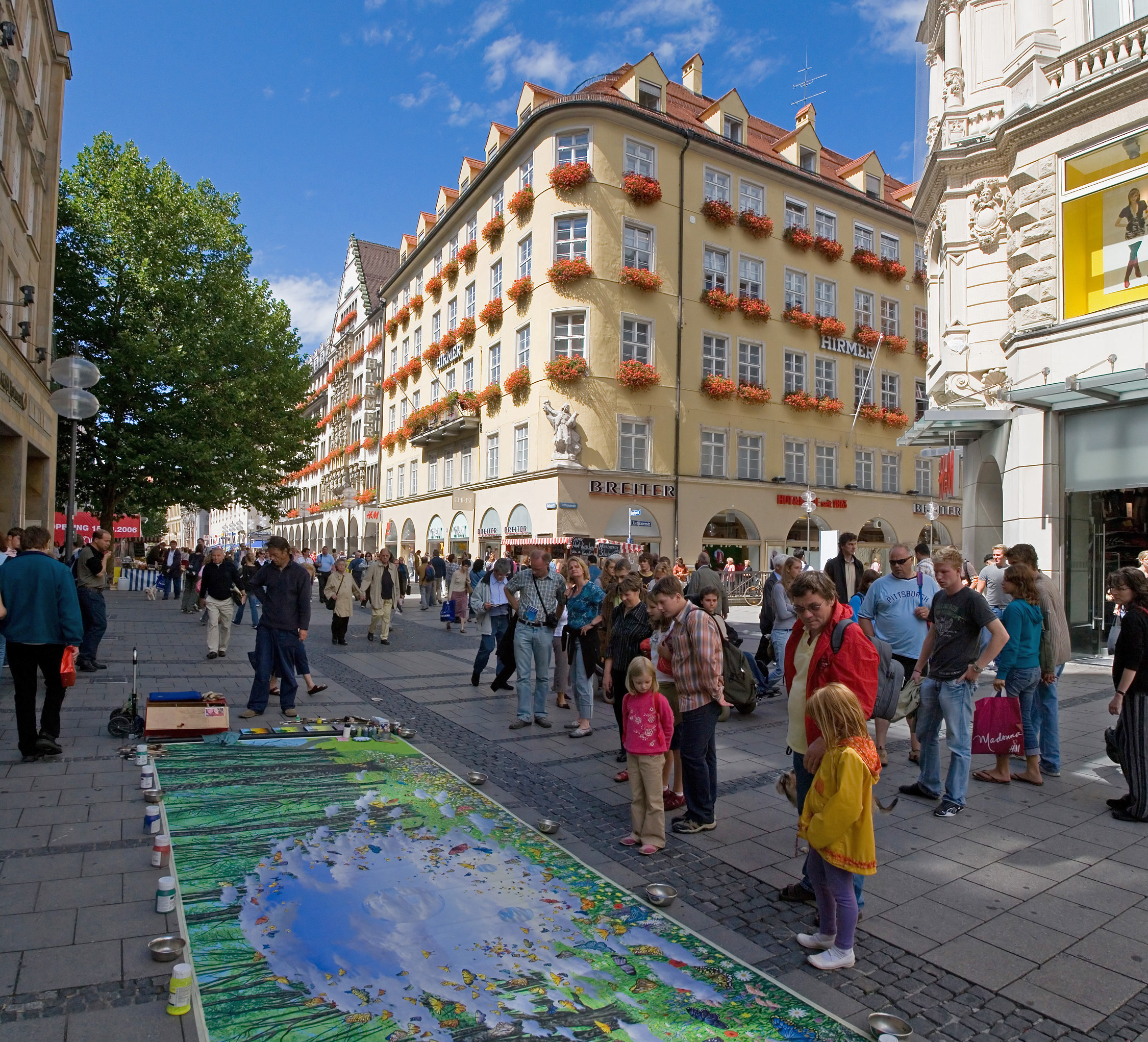
Street art in Kaufingerstraße, near Marienplatz

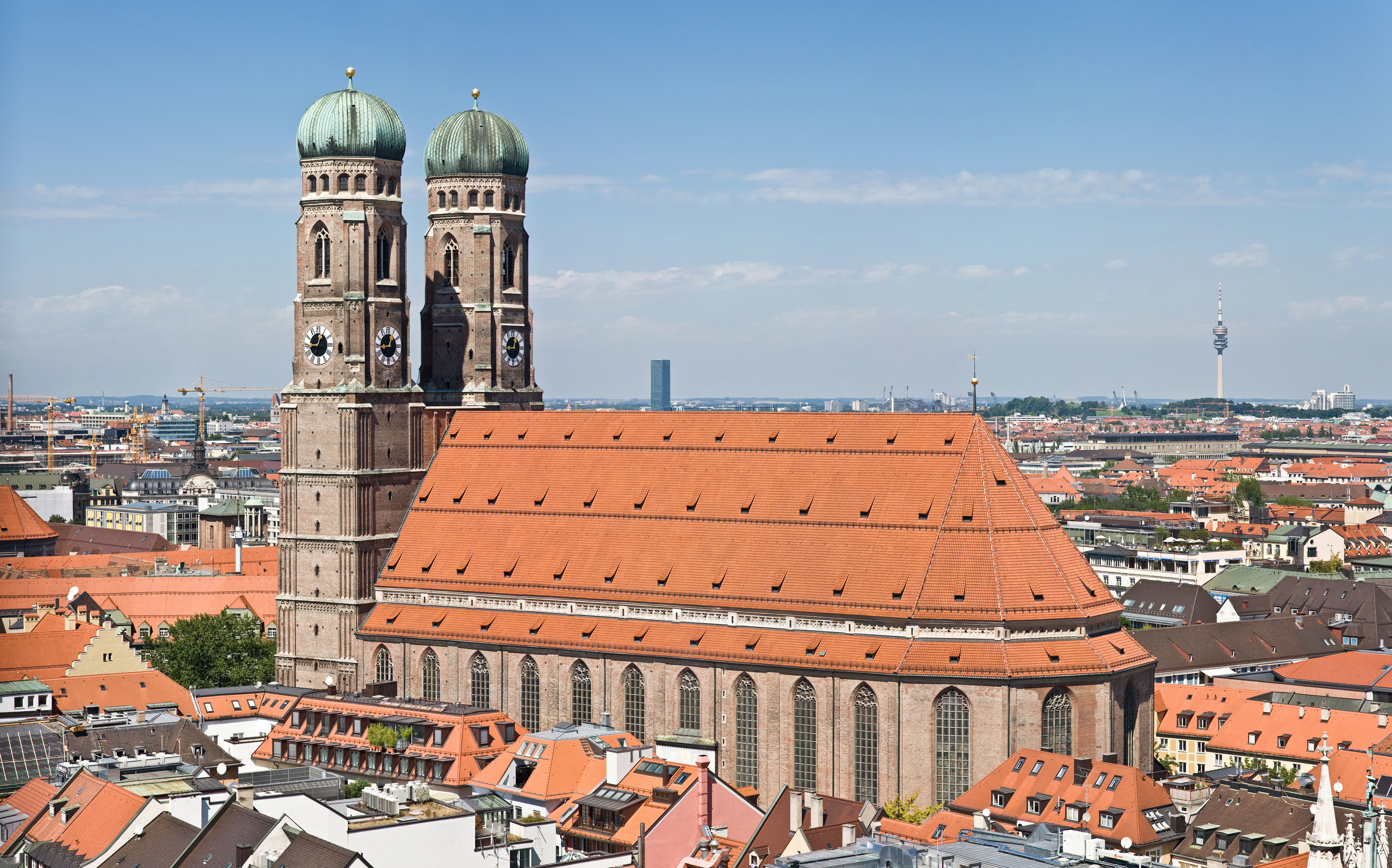
The Frauenkirche as seen from the top of the Peterskirche

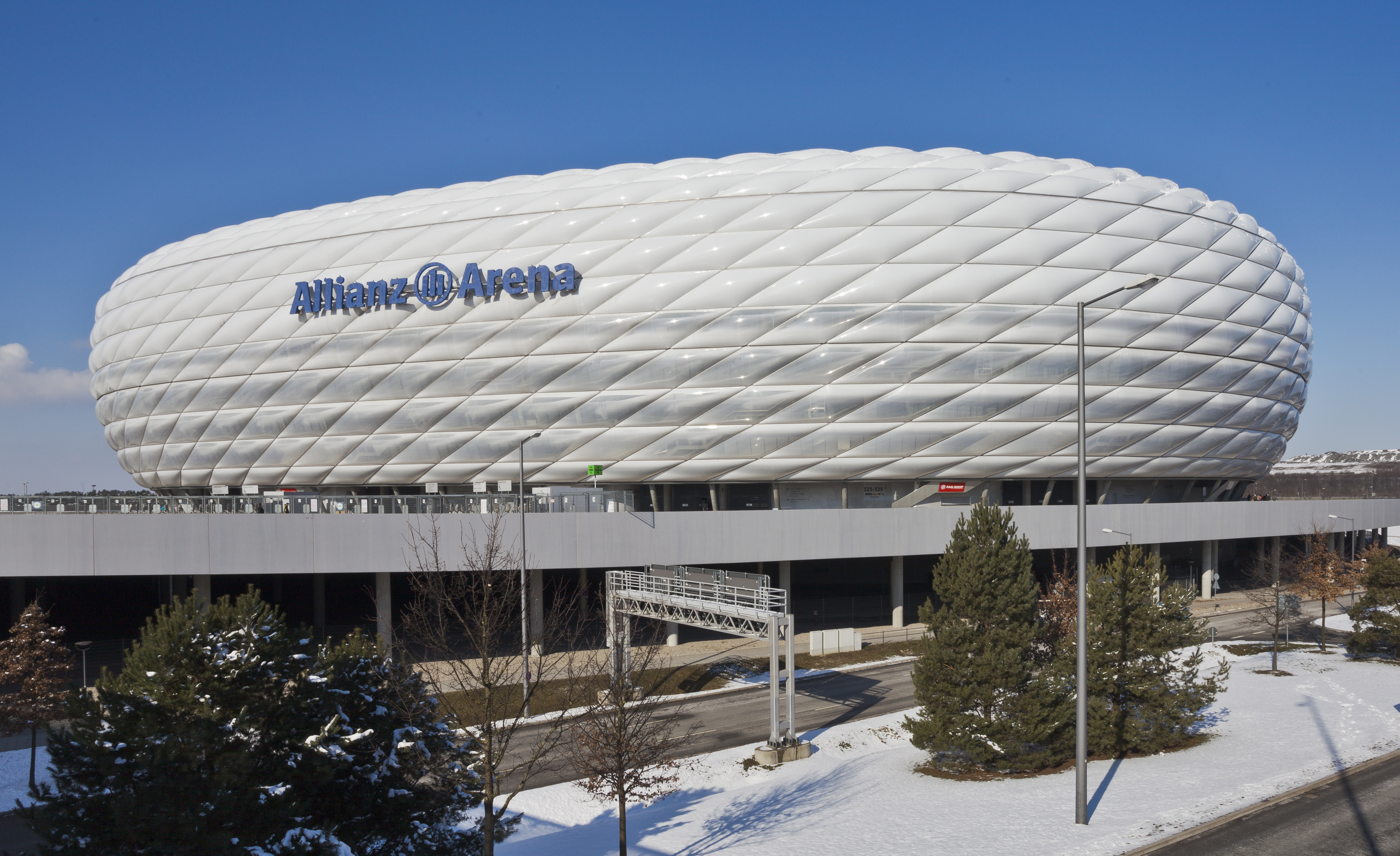
The Allianz Arena

This article gives an overview about the architecture of Munich, Germany.

== Main architectural examples ==
Main architectural sights of Munich
Churches
- Peterskirche
- Frauenkirche
- Heiliggeistkirche
- Michaelskirche
- Paulskirche
- Theatinerkirche
- Trinity Church
- Abbey Church of St Anna
- Asamkirche
- St Michael in Berg am Laim
- Ludwigskirche
Palaces
- Alte Hof
- Residenz
- Palais Preysing
- Palais Holnstein
- Prinz-Carl-Palais
- Nymphenburg Palace
- Amalienburg
- Fürstenried Palace
- Blutenburg Castle
- Schleissheim Palace
Secular buildings
- Old Town Hall
- New Town Hall
- Justizpalast
- Maximilianeum
- Bavarian State Chancellery
- Odeon
- Bavarian State Library
- Academy of Fine Arts
- Old Technical Town Hall
- Hofbräuhaus

Museums
- Glyptothek
- Alte Pinakothek
- Neue Pinakothek
- Pinakothek der Moderne
- Museum Brandhorst
- Bavarian National Museum
- Museum Five Continents
- Deutsches Museum
- BMW Museum
- BMW Welt
Theatres & Monuments
- Cuvilliés Theatre
- National Theatre
- Prinzregententheater
- Gärtnerplatz Theatre
- Isartor
- Ruhmeshalle with Bavaria statue
- Propylaea
- Feldherrnhalle
- Siegestor
- Angel of Peace
Avenues & Squares
- Marienplatz
- Stachus
- Königsplatz
- Brienner Straße
- Odeonsplatz
- Ludwigstraße
- Max-Joseph-Platz
- Maximilianstraße
- Prinzregentenstraße
- Leopoldstraße

Stadiums
- Olympic Stadium
- Allianz Arena
- Grünwalder Stadion
High-rise buildings
- Olympiaturm
- Highlight Towers
- Hochhaus Uptown München
- Hypo-Haus
- BMW Headquarters
Parks
- Hofgarten
- Englischer Garten
- Nymphenburg Park
- Olympia Park
- Botanical garden
- Hellabrunn Zoo

== Marienplatz and Stachus ==
At the center of the city is the Marienplatz – a large open square named after the Mariensäule, a Marian column in its centre – with the Old and the New Town Hall. The New Town Hall's tower contains the Rathaus-Glockenspiel, an ornate clock with almost life-sized moving figures that show scenes from a medieval jousting tournament as well as a performance of the famous "Schäfflertanz" (roughly translated "Barrel-makers' dance". According to the (disproved) tradition, the "Schäffler" supposedly were the first to dance in the streets after the plague ended, thus encouraging the people to cheer up and go outdoors). The old Gothic arsenal building close to Marienplatz houses the Munich Stadtmuseum.

Three gates of the demolished medieval fortification have survived to this day: the Isartor in the east, the Sendlinger Tor in the south and the Karlstor in the west of the inner city. The Karlstor is the oldest building at Stachus, a grand square dominated by the Neo-Baroque Justizpalast (Palace of Justice). The nearby Lenbachplatz is dominated by the Bernheimer-Haus and the Wittelsbacherbrunnen. The adjacent tower is the only relic of the Maxburg, a Renaissance palace which was destroyed in World War II.

The architecture of the Gothic Munich was still strongly influenced by the citizenry and not much different from the other ducal cities such as Landshut, Ingolstadt and Straubing. When Bavaria was reunited in 1506 Munich became capital of the whole of Bavaria. The arts then became increasingly influenced by the court and Munich began to outperform the other cities of the duchy.

== Houses of worship in the inner city ==
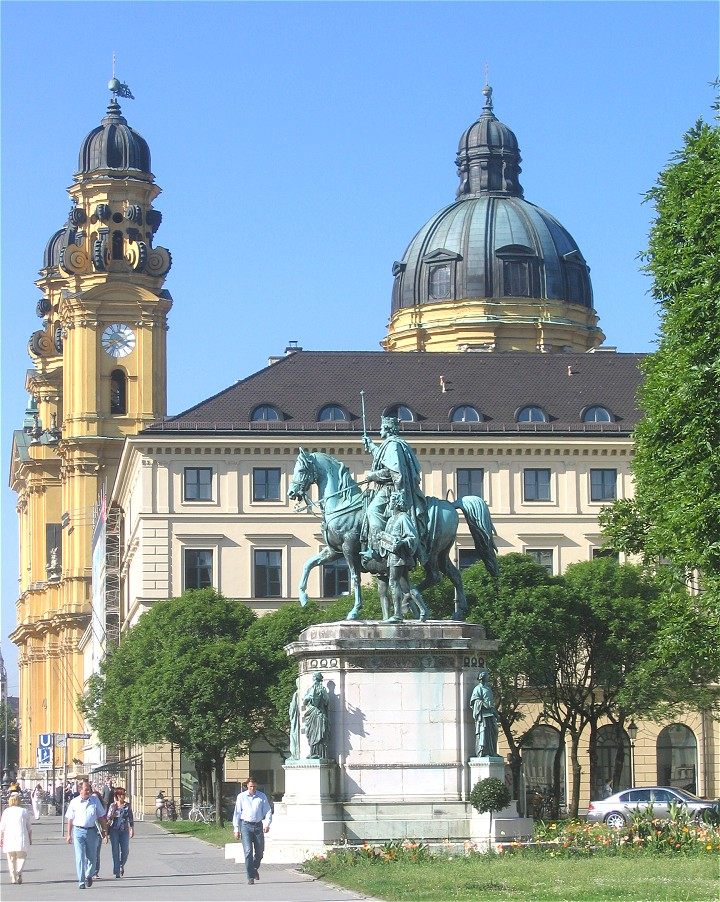
Theatinerkirche at Odeonsplatz

The Peterskirche close to Marienplatz is the oldest church of the inner city. It was first built during the Romanesque period, and was the focus of the early monastic settlement in Munich before the city's official foundation in 1158.

Nearby St. Peter the Gothic hall-church Heiliggeistkirche (The Church of the Holy Ghost) was converted to baroque style from 1724 onwards and looks down upon the Viktualienmarkt, the most popular market of Munich.

The Frauenkirche (Dom zu unserer Lieben Frau – Cathedral of Our Lady) is the most famous building in the city center and serves as cathedral for the Archdiocese of Munich and Freising. The Frauenkirche was constructed from red brick in the late Gothic style within only 20 years from 1468. Also the late gothic churches of the churchyards of St. Peter and of the Frauenkirche, the Kreuzkirche close to the Sendlinger Tor and St. Salvator nearby the cathedral still exist. The former gothic Augustinerkirche next to the Frauenkirche today houses the German Hunting and Fishing Museum.

The nearby Michaelskirche is the largest renaissance church north of the Alps. The church was built by William V, Duke of Bavaria between 1583 and 1597 as a spiritual center for the Counter Reformation. In order to realise his ambitious plans for the church and the adjoining college, Duke Wilhelm had 87 houses in the best location pulled down, ignoring the protests of the citizens.

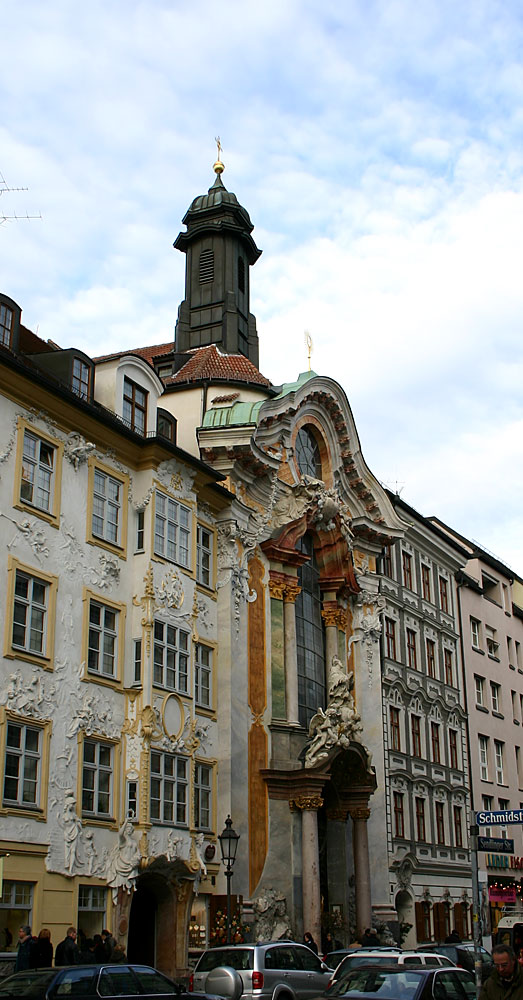
Asam Church

The eldest Baroque church of the inner city is the Karmelitenkirche at Promenadeplatz, which was constructed shortly before the Italian baroque was introduced in Munich under Princess Henriette Adelaide of Savoy. The Italian court architects such as Enrico Zuccalli and Giovanni Antonio Viscardi then controlled the architecture in Munich for several decades. The Theatinerkirche (1663–1690) is a basilica in Italianate high baroque which had a major influence on Southern German baroque architecture. Its dome dominates the Odeonsplatz. Other Italian baroque churches in the inner city which are worth a detour are the Bürgersaalkirche (1709) and the Dreifaltigkeitskirche (1711–1718).

St. Anna im Lehel by Johann Michael Fischer was the first Rococo church in Bavaria (1727–1733). The Damenstiftskirche St. Anna was built in 1733 by Johann Baptist Gunetzrhainer. The Asamkirche was endowed and built by the Brothers Asam from 1733, pioneering artists of the Rococo period.

With the 19th-century architectural revival styles many new Catholic churches were constructed also in Munich. Since Middle Franconia whose population is predominantly of Protestant origin was annexed by Bavaria the first Protestant churches St Mathaeus, St. Martin and St. Lukas in Munich were erected in this period as well. Among the Neo-Romanesque churches are St. Anna im Lehel, St. Maximilian and St. Benno in Neuhausen. At the east side of the river Isar three large neo-Gothic churches were constructed: The Maria-Hilf-Kirche in der Au, St.Johannis in Haidhausen and the Kreuzkirche in Giesing. The largest neo-Gothic church is St.Paul at Theresienwiese. Among the Neo-Renaissance churches is St.Ursula in Schwabing and the largest neo-baroque churches are St.Margaret in Sendling and St.Joseph in Schwabing.

On 9 November 2006 the new Ohel Jakob synagogue was opened on Sankt-Jakobs-Platz, 68 years after the massive Kristallnacht pogrom .

A new mosque is planned not far from the city center on a vacant lot. An Islamic prayer house still exists in the vicinity but the plans for a bigger and more representative building face to face with a Catholic church are discussed controversially.

== Palaces in the inner city ==
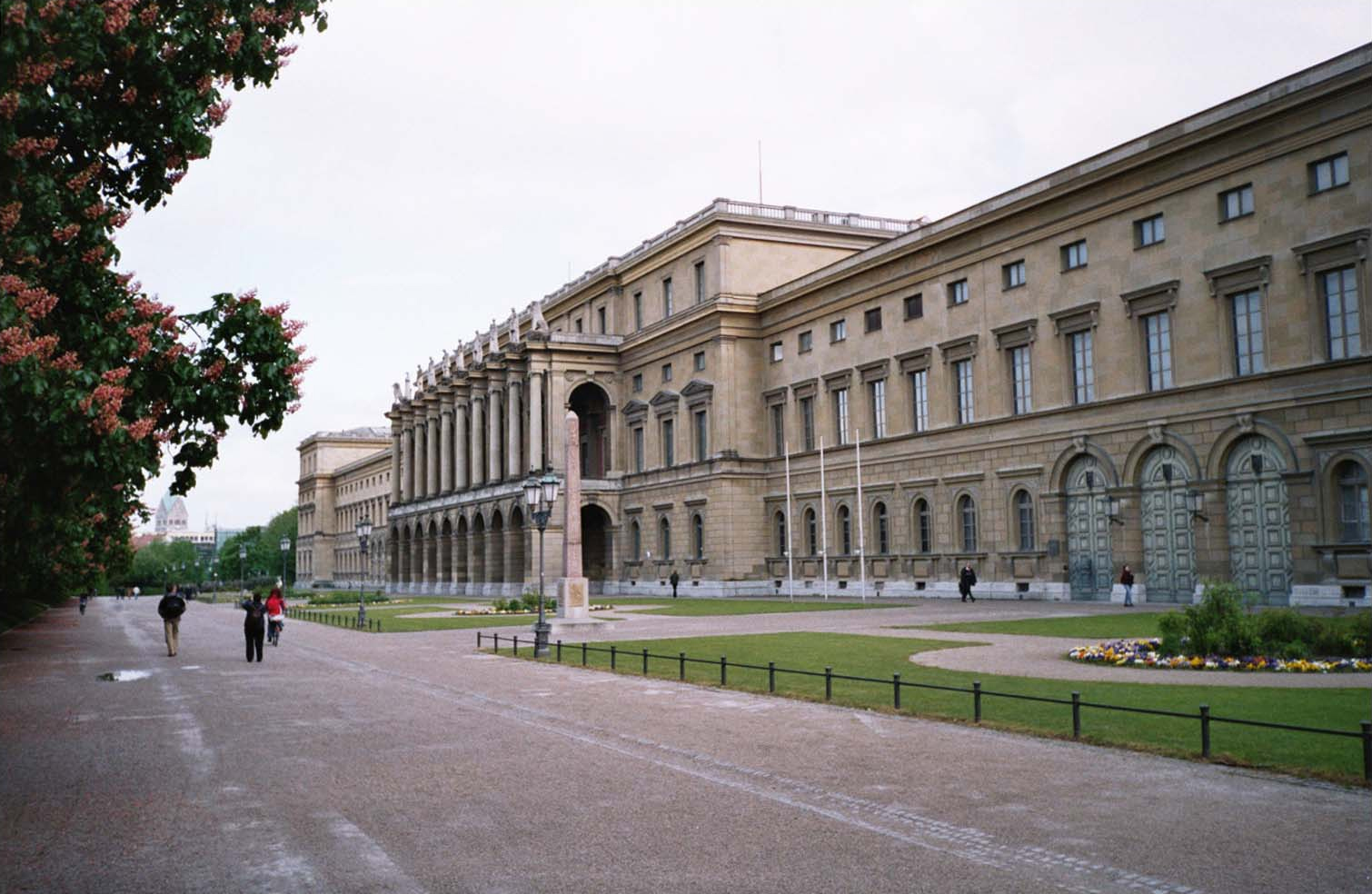
Festsaalbau of the Residenz

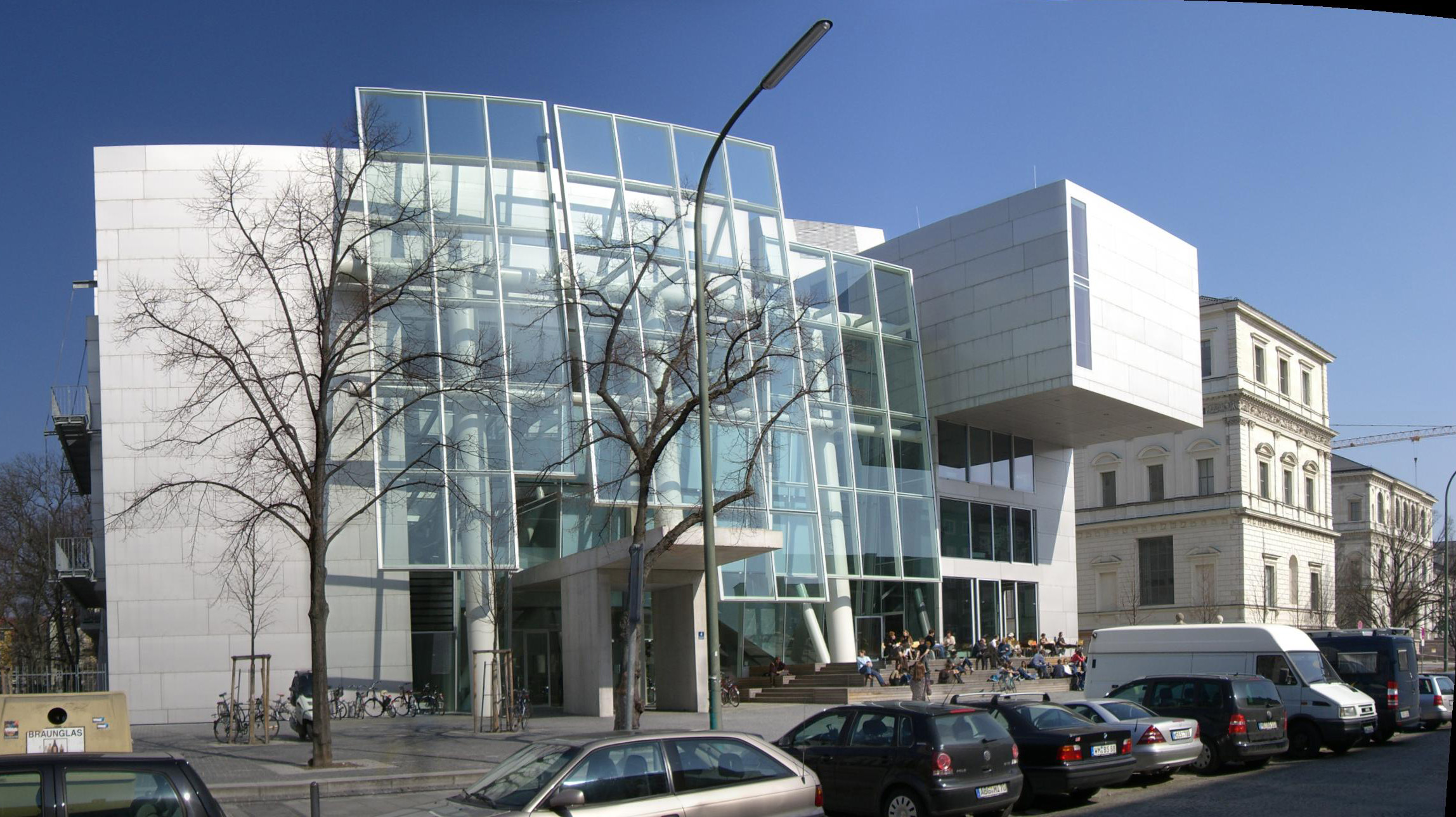
Academy of Fine Arts

The Gothic Alte Hof, a medieval castle and first residence of the Wittelsbach dukes in Munich still exists in the inner city close to Marienplatz. The Renaissance Mint Yard with its neoclassical façade is situated between the old castle and the Residenz. The Old Academy next to St. Michael also dates from the renaissance era.

The large Residenz palace complex (begun in 1385) on the edge of Munich's Old Town ranks among Europe's most significant museums of interior decoration. Having undergone several extensions, it contains also the treasury and the splendid Rococo Cuvilliés Theatre. The complex of buildings contains ten courtyards and the museum displays 130 rooms. The four main parts are the Königsbau (near the Max-Joseph-Platz), the Alte Residenz (towards the Residenzstraße), the Festsaalbau (towards the Hofgarten) and the Byzantine Court Church of All Saints (Allerheiligen-Hofkirche). Opposite to the church the building for the Marstall (Royal Stables) was erected. Facing the Hofgarten on the east side is the Bavarian Staatskanzlei ("State Chancellery"), housed in the former Army Museum, with the addition of glass wings left and right of the original building. The repurposed building was completed in 1993.

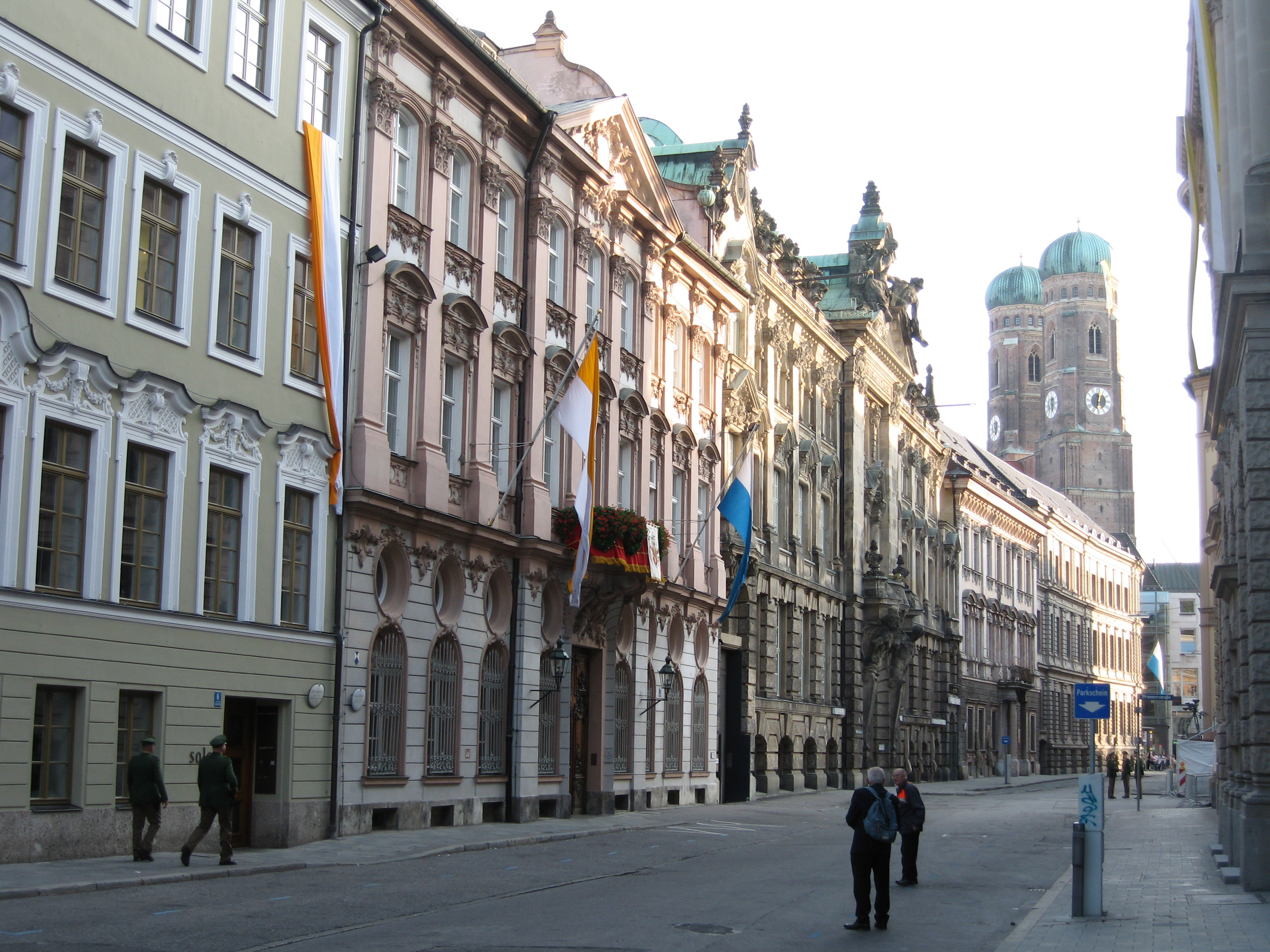
Kardinal-Faulhaber-Straße with Palais Holnstein and Palais Porcia

Among the baroque and neoclassical mansions which still exist in Munich are the Palais Porcia, the Palais Törring-Jettenbach with its loggia, the Palais Preysing, the Palais Holnstein (the residence of the Archbishop of Munich and Freising), the Palais Leuchtenberg (the former residence of Eugène de Beauharnais) and the Prinz-Carl-Palais, the official residence of Bavaria's state premier (or Ministerpräsident). All mansions are situated close to the Residenz.

The Maxburg, a renaissance palace north of Stachus, was destroyed in World War II, only a tower has been preserved and integrated into a modern building. The Neue Landschaftsgebäude at Roßmarkt close to the Sendlinger Tor is a palatial building which was constructed in 1774 by François de Cuvilliés the Younger for the Bavarian Estates.

== Royal avenues, museums and theatres ==
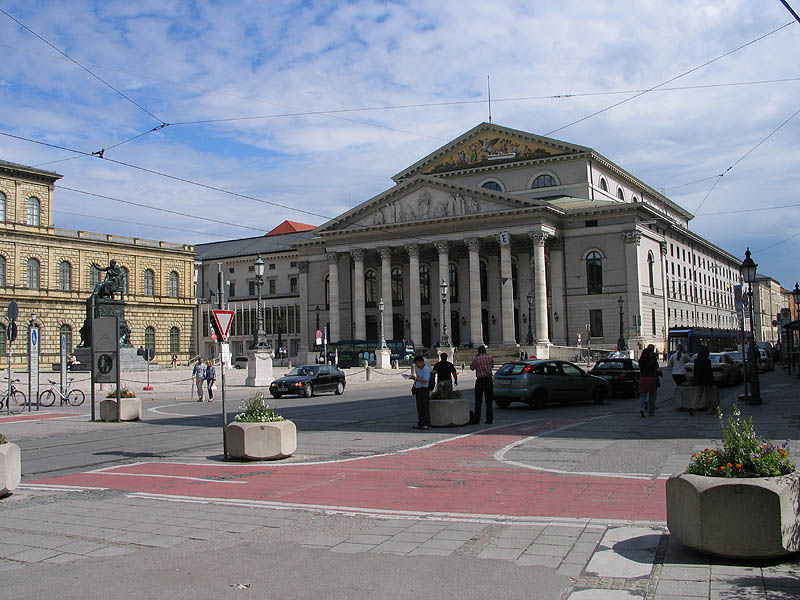
Munich, Residenz and National Theatre

Next door to the Residenz the neo-classical opera, the Nationaltheater was erected. On its left hand side the modern Residenz Theatre was constructed in the building that had housed the Cuvilliés Theatre before World War II.

Four grand royal avenues of the 19th century with magnificent official buildings connect Munich's inner city with the suburbs:

The neoclassical Brienner Straße was constructed in line with a draft of Karl von Fischer and Friedrich Ludwig von Sckell under the reign of Maximilian I Joseph of Bavaria from 1812 onwards.

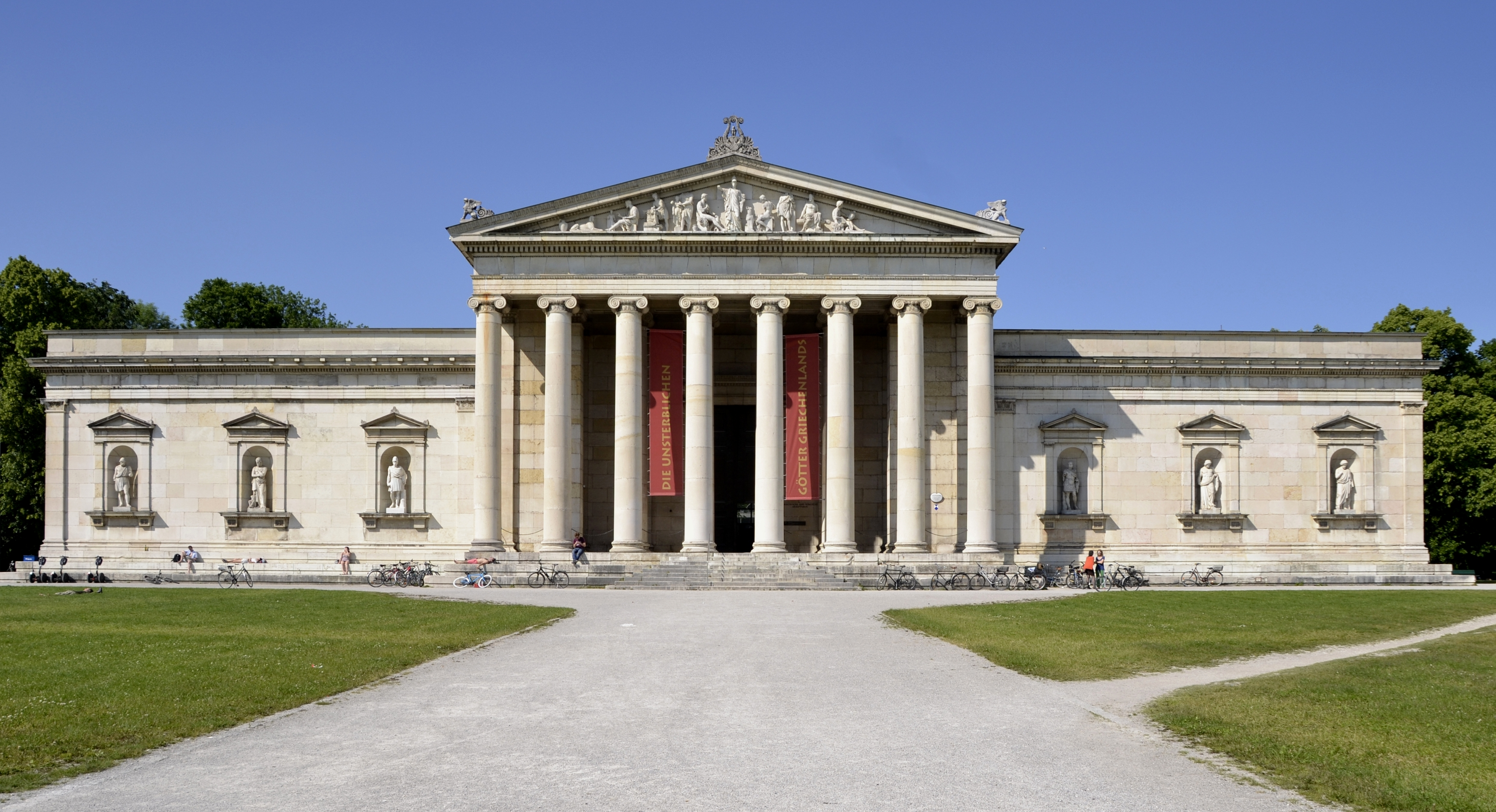
Glyptothek

It is starting at Odeonsplatz on the northern fringe of the Old Town close to the Residenz, runs from east to west and passes the square Wittelsbacher Platz and the circular Karolinenplatz with its obelisk, and finally opens into the impressive Königsplatz, designed with the "Doric" Propylaea, the "Ionic" Glyptothek and the "Corinthian" State Museum of Classical Art, on its back side St. Boniface's Abbey was erected. In the most western part between Königsplatz and Stiglmeierplatz the Munich modern Volkstheater (roughly translated as "People's Theatre") was founded in 1983. The area around Königsplatz is home to the Kunstareal, Munich's gallery and museum quarter. It consists also of the three "Pinakotheken" galleries (Alte Pinakothek, Neue Pinakothek and Pinakothek der Moderne), the Lenbachhaus, the Museum Brandhorst and the Staatliche Sammlung für Ägyptische Kunst. The Alte Pinakothek and the Lenbachhaus are buildings in Neo-Renaissance style, which suffered damage during World War II, for the other museums modern buildings were created.

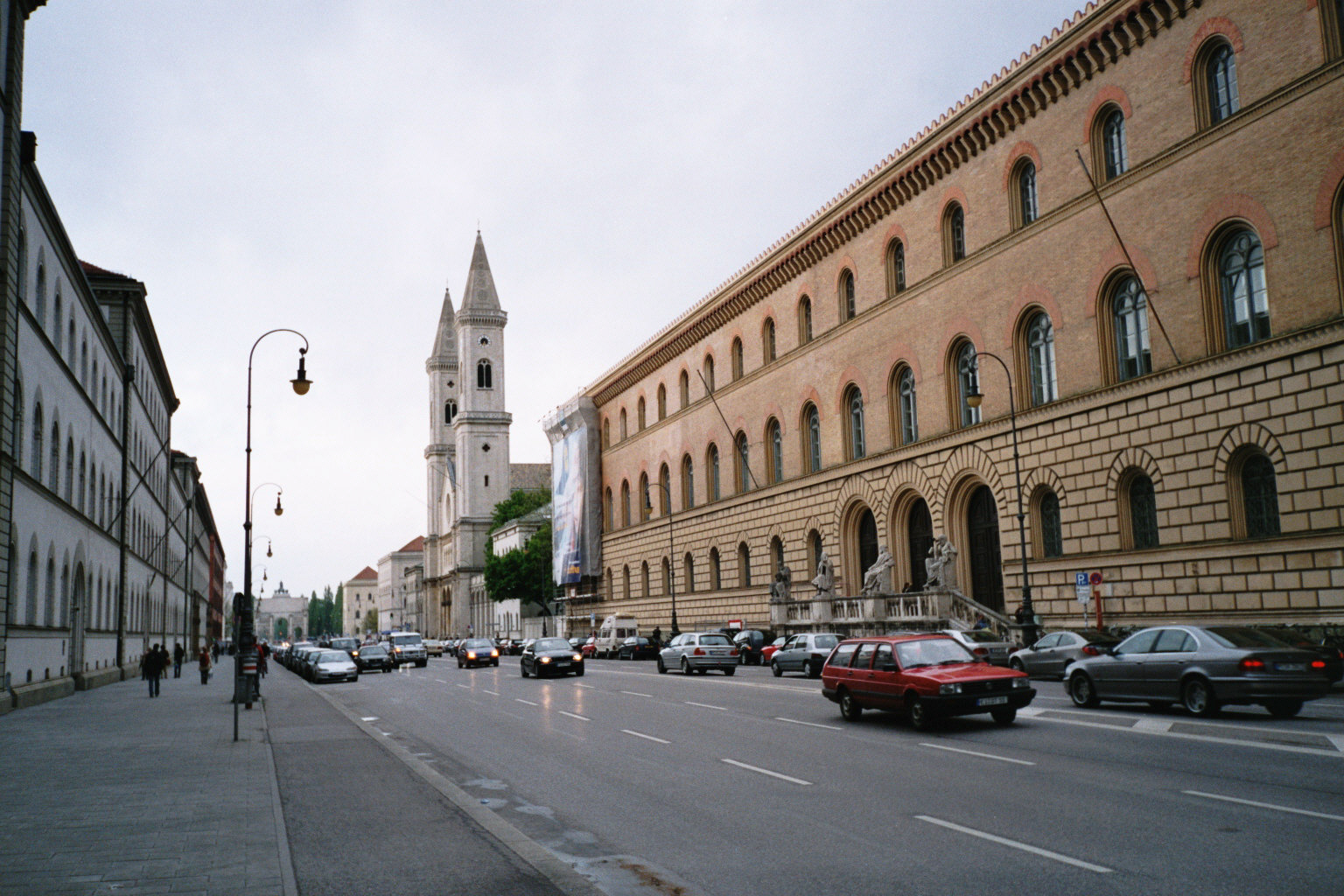
Ludwigstraße

The Ludwigstraße was constructed from 1816. The southern part of the avenue was constructed in Italian renaissance style by Leo von Klenze from 1816 onwards. The northern part was then constructed since 1827 in line with a plan of Klenze's rival Friedrich von Gärtner, the appearance is strongly influenced by Italian Romanesque architecture. Same as the Brienner Straße the avenue of King Ludwig I begins at Odeonsplatz but runs from south to north, it leads from the Feldherrnhalle in the south to the victory gate Siegestor in the north, skirting LMU Munich, the St. Louis church, the Bavarian State Library and numerous state ministries and palaces. Behind the Siegestor the avenue is called Leopoldstraße, which is the main boulevard of Schwabing. Nearby the gate the Neo-Renaissance building of the Academy of Fine Arts Munich is situated.

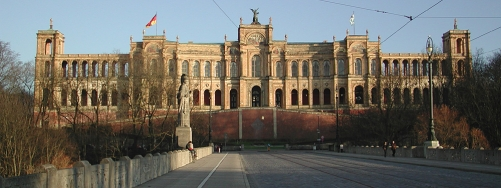
Maximilianeum

The neo-Gothic Maximilianstraße was constructed under king Maximilian II of Bavaria, who started the project in 1850, the leading architect was Friedrich Bürklein. Maximilianstraße starts at Max-Joseph-Platz, where the Residenz and the National Theatre are situated, and runs from west to east. The avenue is framed by neo-Gothic buildings which house, among others, the Schauspielhaus and the Building of the district government of Upper Bavaria and the Museum Five Continents. After crossing the river Isar, the avenue circles the Maximilianeum, home of a gifted students' foundation and the state parliament. The western portion of Maximilianstraße is known for its designer shops, luxury boutiques, jewellery stores, and one of Munich's foremost five-star hotels, the Hotel Vier Jahreszeiten (Four Seasons).

The Prinzregentenstraße runs parallel to Maximilianstraße and begins at Prinz-Carl-Palais, in the northeastern part of the Old Town. The avenue was constructed from 1891 onwards as a prime address for the middle-class during the reign of Luitpold, Prince Regent of Bavaria and is named Prinzregentenstraße in his honour. Many museums can be found along the avenue, such as the internationally renowned Haus der Kunst (House of Art), the Bayerisches Nationalmuseum (Bavarian National Museum) and the modern adjoining Bavarian State Archaeological Collection, the Schackgalerie and the Villa Stuck on the eastern side of the river. The avenue crosses the river and circles the Friedensengel (Angel of Peace), a monument commemorating the 25 years of peace following the Franco-Prussian War in 1871. The Prinzregententheater, another important theatre, is at Prinzregentenplatz further to the east.

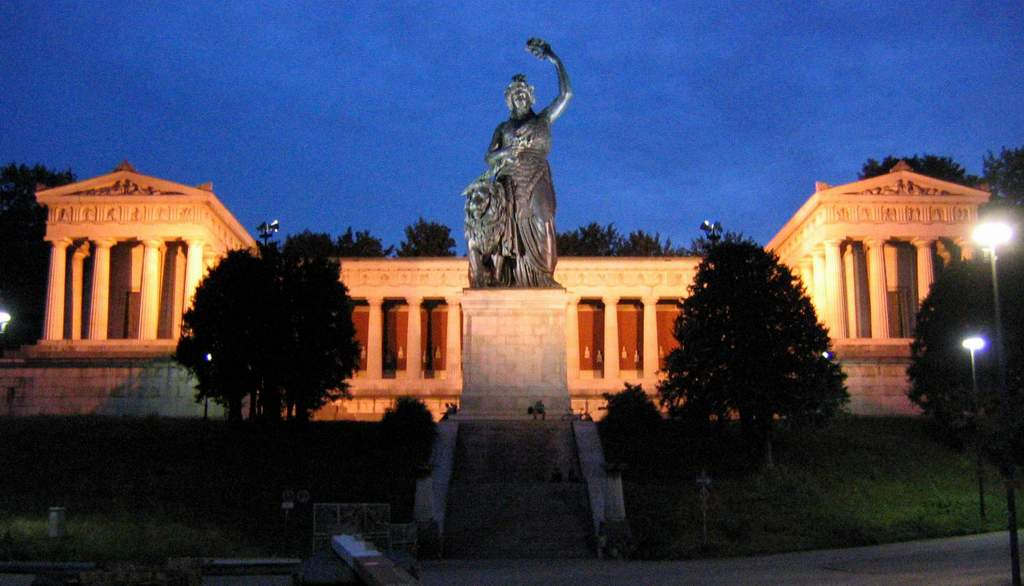
Bavaria statue

The Bavaria statue (German just 'Bavaria') is a bronze-cast statue of a female figure representing Bavaria's "secular patron saint", the Tellus (Mater) Bavarica ("goddess of the land of Bavaria"), located at the border of the Theresienwiese, in the southwest of the inner city where the Oktoberfest takes place. The statue was commissioned by Ludwig I of Bavaria. Leo von Klenze constructed the Doric building of the Ruhmeshalle (Hall of Fame) in the background of the Bavaria.

The neoclassical Gärtnerplatz Theatre is a ballet and musical state theatre on the left bank of the Isar in the south of the inner city. The modern Gasteig center is situated on the opposite bank of the river, close to the Volksbad, a large public bath built in the art nouveau style.

The Deutsches Museum, is located nearby on an island in the Isar, is one of the oldest and largest science museums in the world.

== Palaces in the suburbs ==
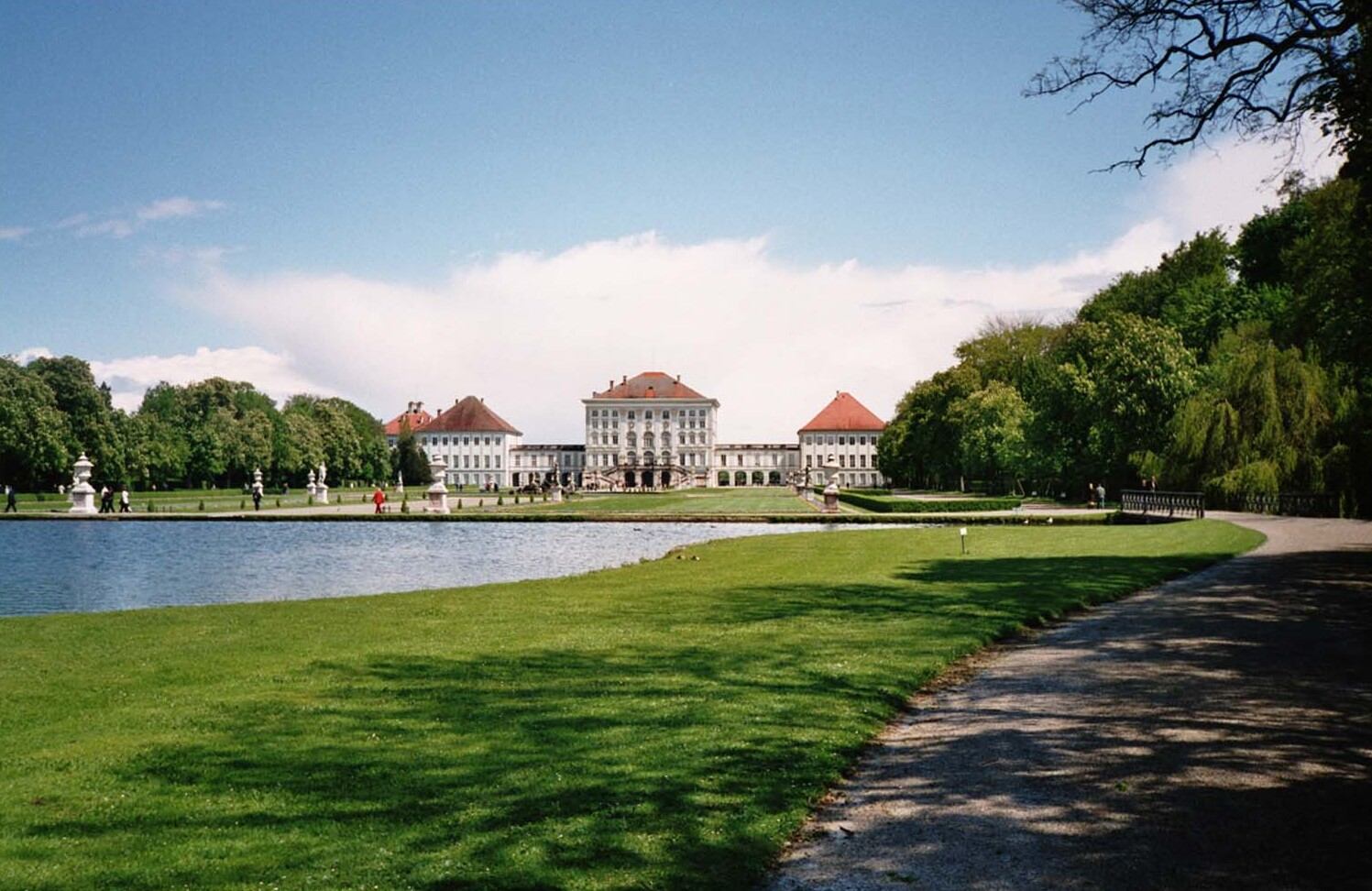
Nymphenburg Palace

Two large baroque palaces in Nymphenburg and Oberschleissheim are reminders of Bavaria's royal past.

Nymphenburg Palace, some 6 km north west of the city centre, was constructed from 1664 and is surrounded by an impressive park and is considered to be one of Europe's most beautiful royal residences. The palace was commissioned by the prince-electoral couple Ferdinand Maria and Henriette Adelaide of Savoy to the designs of the Italian architect Agostino Barelli after the birth of their son Max II Emanuel. Starting in 1701, Max Emanuel conducted a systematic extension of the palace. The first half of Max Emanuel's reign was still dominated by his parents' Italian court artists, like Enrico Zuccalli and Giovanni Antonio Viscardi. With the appointment of Joseph Effner serving as chief architect of the court and the young François de Cuvilliés as his assistant, the French influence significantly increased and Max Emanuel's return in 1715 marked the origin of the era of Bavarian Rococo. Within the park, a number of pavilions were built such as the Pagodenburg (1716–1719), the Badenburg (1719–1721) and the Amalienburg, a Rococo hunting lodge constructed in 1734–1739 by François de Cuvilliés.

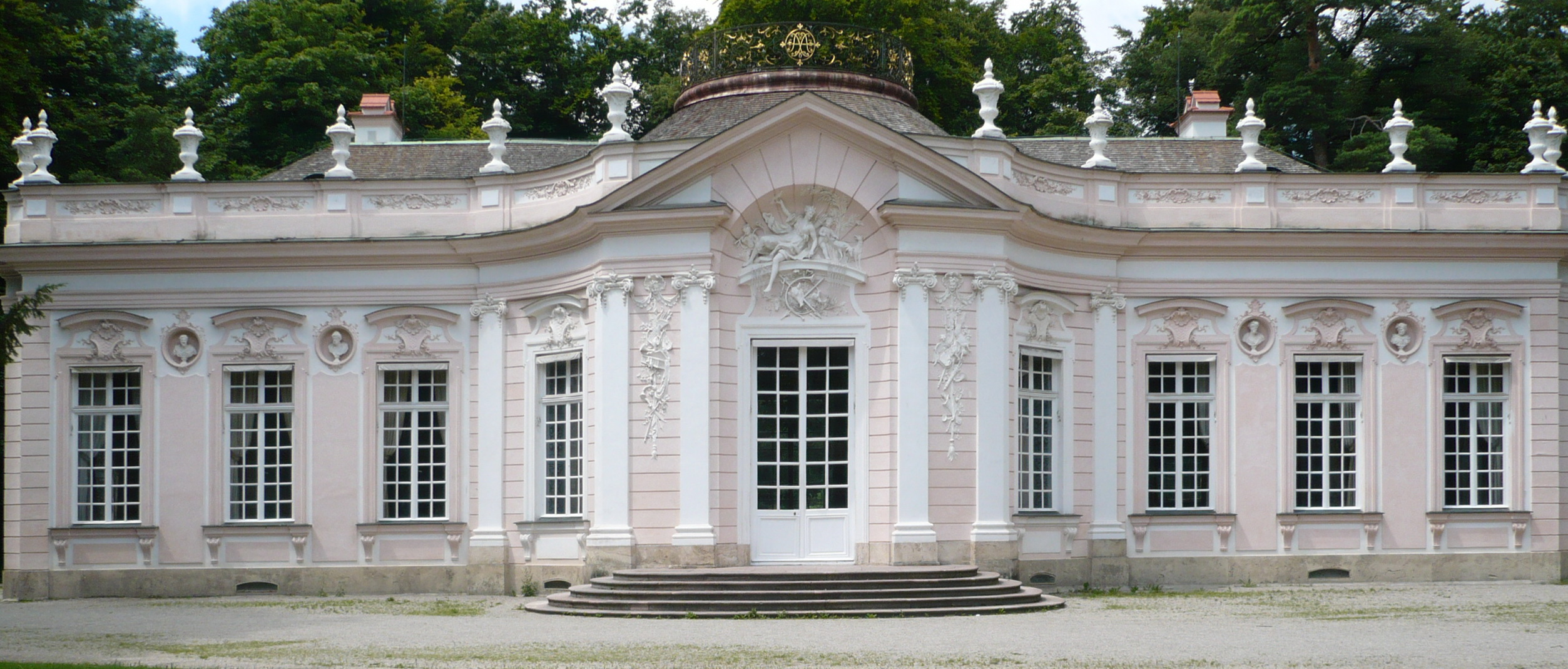
Amalienburg

The second large baroque residence is Schloss Schleissheim (Schleissheim Palace), located in the suburb of Oberschleissheim, a palace complex encompassing three separate residences: Altes Schloss Schleissheim (the old palace; 1617–1623), Neues Schloss Schleissheim (the new palace; 1701–1726) and Schloss Lustheim (Lustheim Palace; 1684–1688). Most parts of the palace complex serve as museums and art galleries.

The Schloss Fürstenried (Fürstenried Palace), a baroque palace of similar structure to Nymphenburg but of much smaller size, was erected 1715–1717 in the south west of Munich.

The oldest summer residences of the Wittelsbach were Schloss Dachau (Dachau Palace) close to Oberschleissheim and the gothic Burg Grünwald (Grünwald castle) in the southern suburb of Grünwald. 2 km north west of Nymphenburg Palace Schloss Blutenburg (Blutenburg Castle) is situated, an old ducal country seat with a late-Gothic palace church.

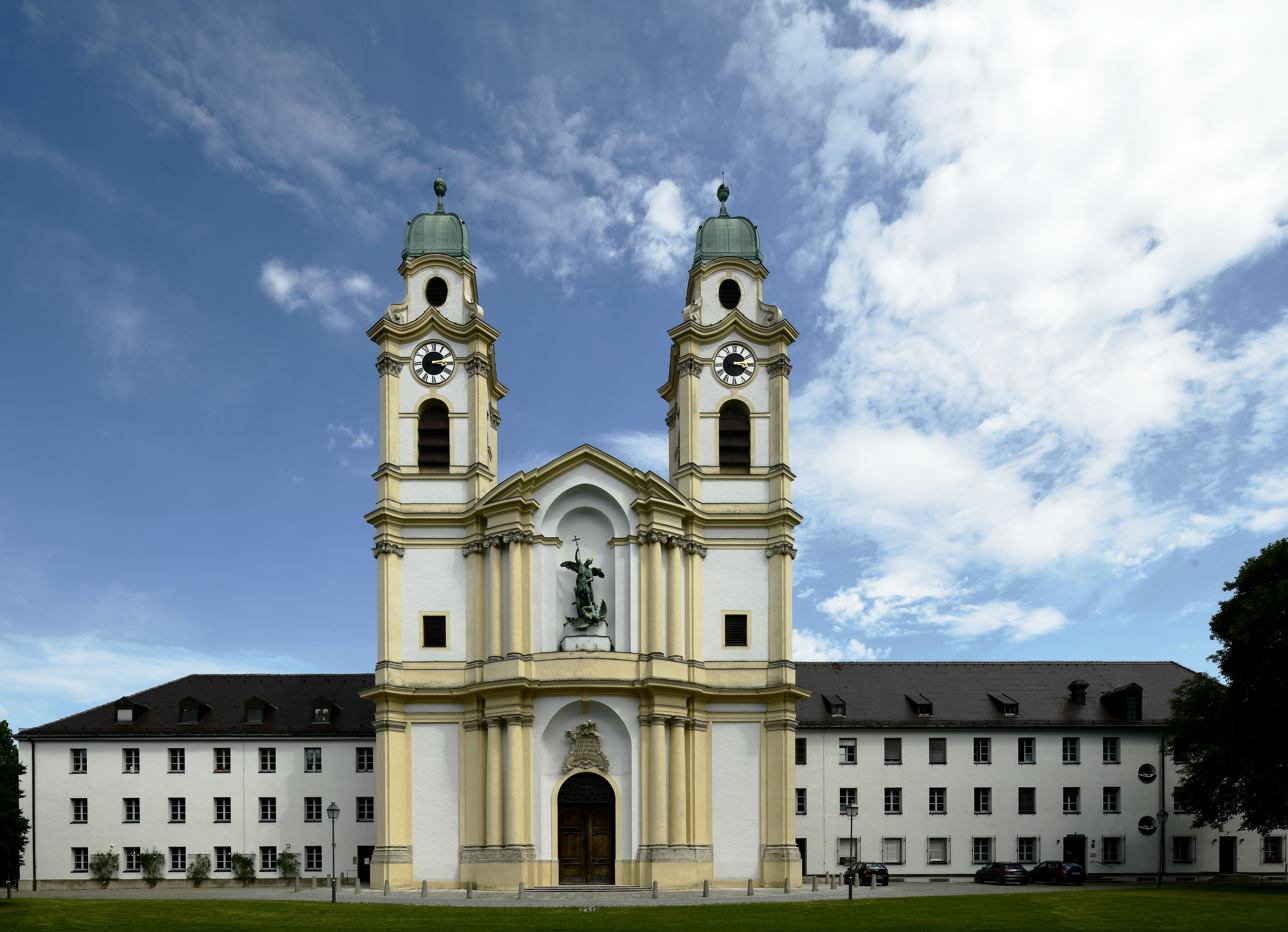
St Michael in Berg am Laim

== Churches in the suburbs ==
The oldest church within the city borders is the Holy Cross Church in the suburb of Fröttmaning next to the Allianz Arena, with a Romanesque fresco. The interior of the Gothic St. Mary's Church in the district Ramersdorf-Perlach of Munich was re-designed in Baroque style.

The Rococo church St Michael in Berg am Laim was built by Johann Michael Fischer.

== Modern Munich ==
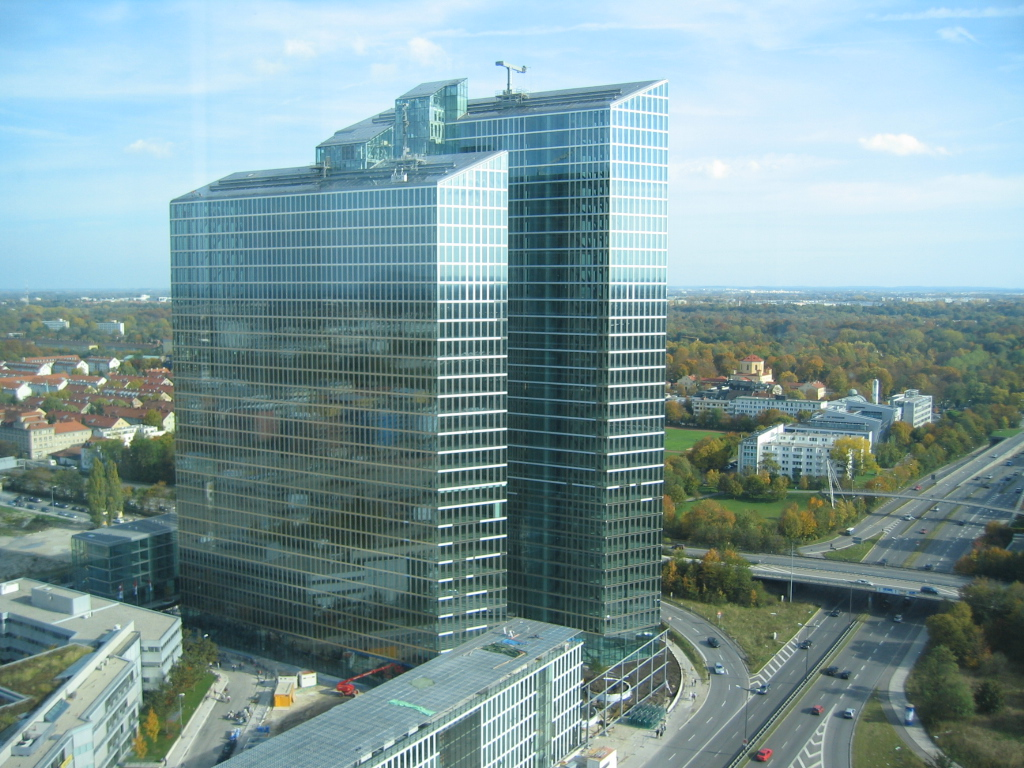
Highlight Towers

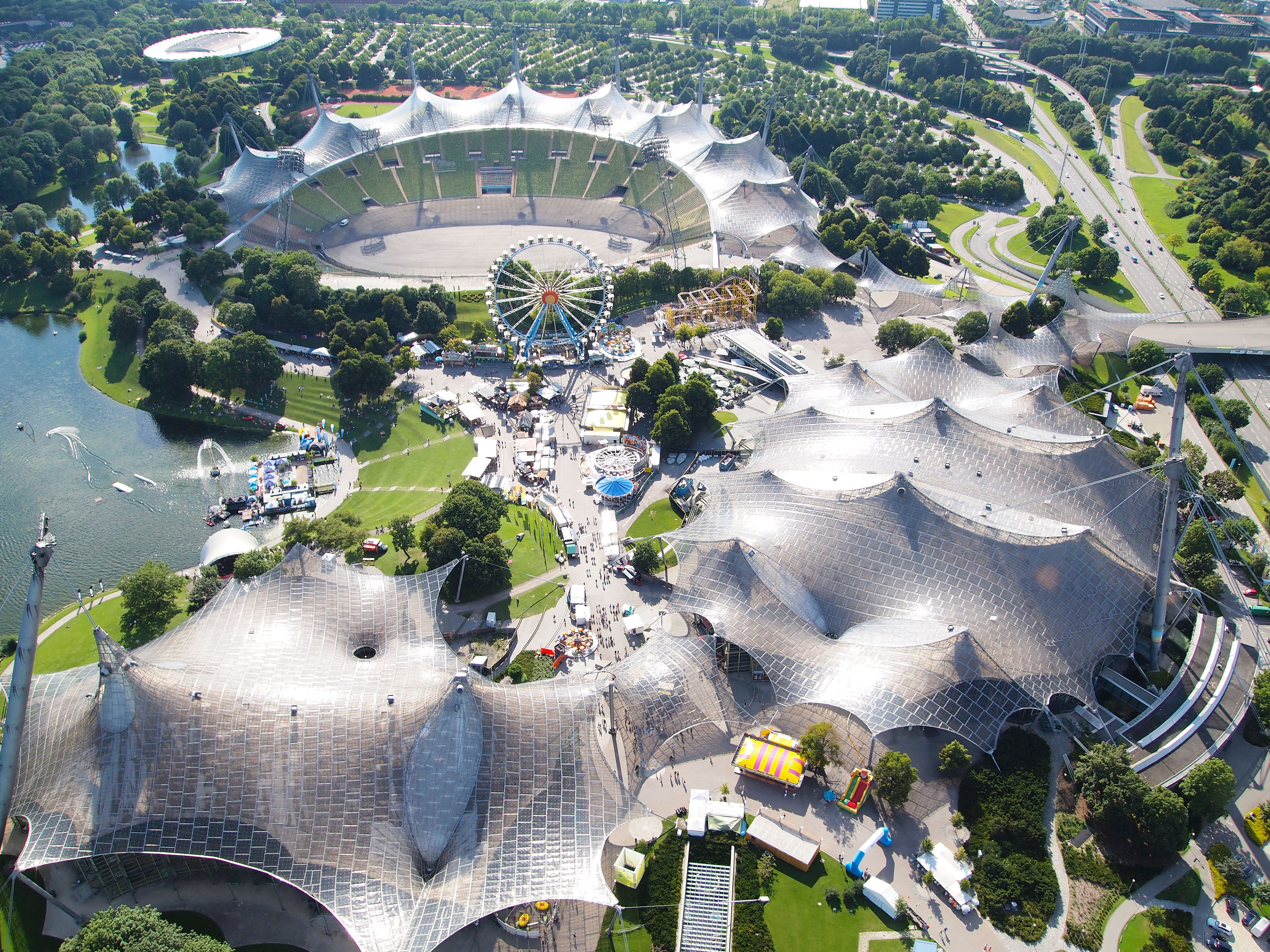
Olympiahalle, Olympic Stadium and Olympic Swim Hall

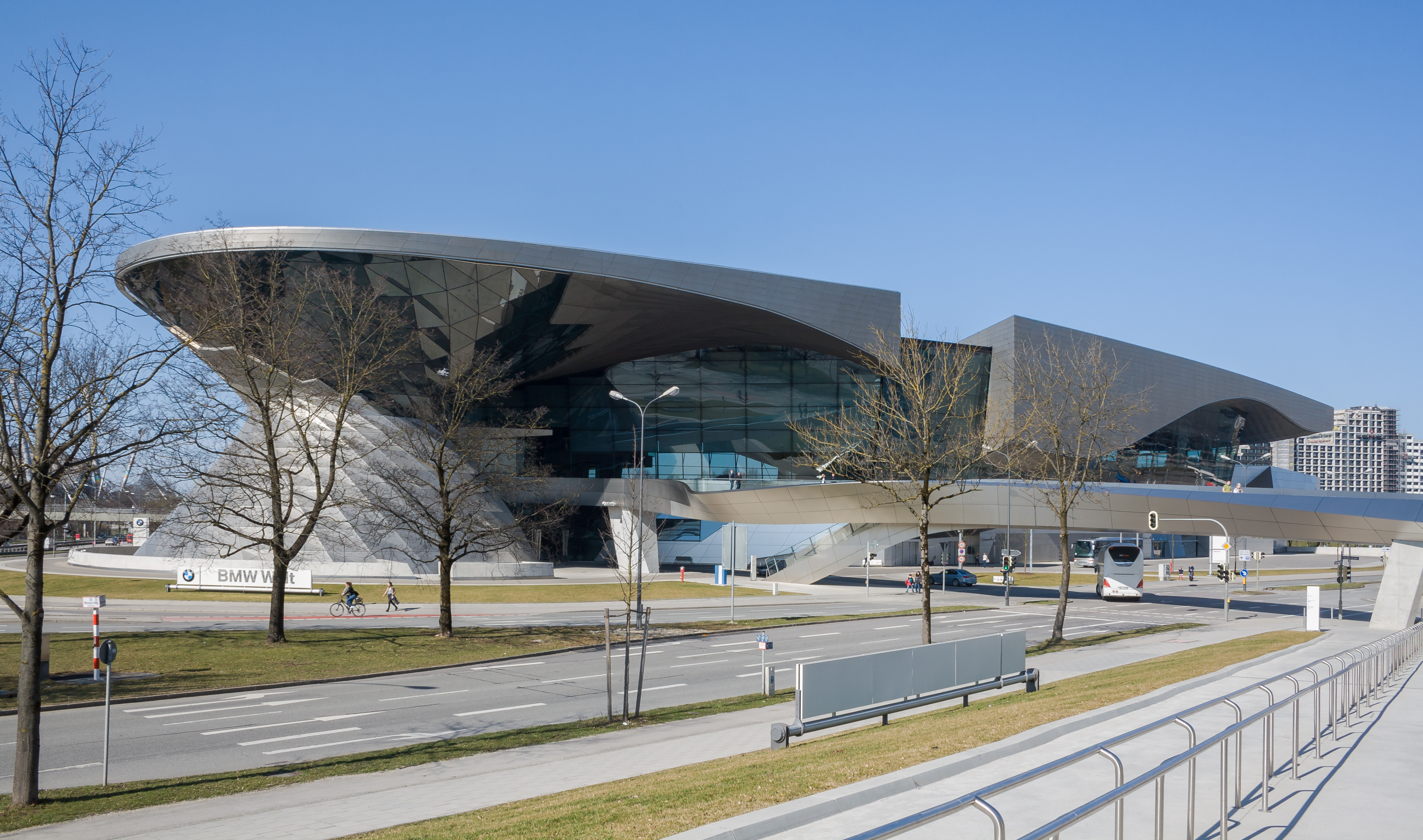
BMW Welt

Munich features a wide and diverse array of modern architecture, although strict height limitations for buildings have limited the construction of skyscrapers. Most high-rise buildings are clustered at the northern edge of Munich, like the Hypo-Haus, the Arabella High-Rise Building, the Highlight Towers, Uptown Munich and the BMW Headquarters (with the adjoining BMW Welt) next to the Olympic Park. Several other high-rise buildings are located near the city center and on the Siemens campus in southern Munich.

A landmark of modern Munich is also the architecture of its two large sport arenas. The Olympic Park with its stadium was built for the Munich 1972 Summer Olympics, inspired by dew-covered cobwebs. The Allianz Arena by Herzog & De Meuron is located in the northern suburb of Fröttmaning.

In November 2004, a referendum was held to decide whether the construction of high-rise buildings in the inner city should be prohibited; as its result, several building projects, among them the planned new office building of Süddeutscher Verlag, had to be changed substantially or given up completely. However, as of 2006, there is an ongoing discussion in the city council on how to proceed with future building plans. Despite the referendum the Süddeutsche Verlag was completed in 2008 and other taller buildings are planned, for example, near the Olympiapark.
