= Fröttmaninger Berg =

Mountain in Bavaria, Germany

Coordinates: 48°12′53″N 11°37′54″E

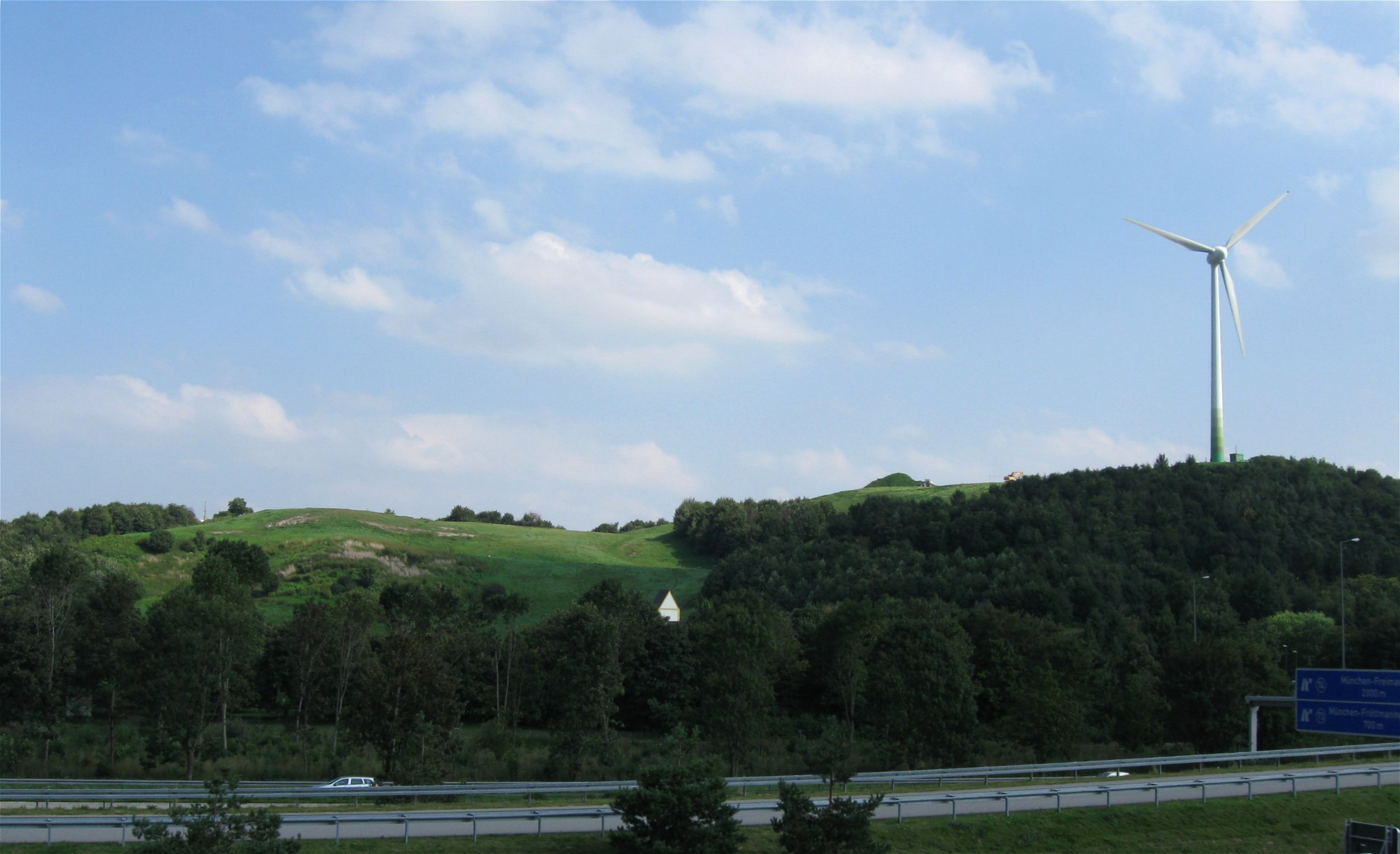

Highest point
- Elevation: 75 m (246 ft)

Geography
- Location: Bavaria, Germany

Geology
- Mountain type: Artificial hill

Fröttmaninger Berg is a hill and recreational area on the edge of Munich, Germany. The 75-metre-high hill with a wind turbine on its top is artificial, it is a former landfill site. The nearby Holy Cross Church is the last remaining building of the abandoned village Fröttmaning, and the oldest extant church building in the city area of Munich.
