= Wittelsbacherbrunnen (Lenbachplatz) =

Wittelsbacher Brunnen
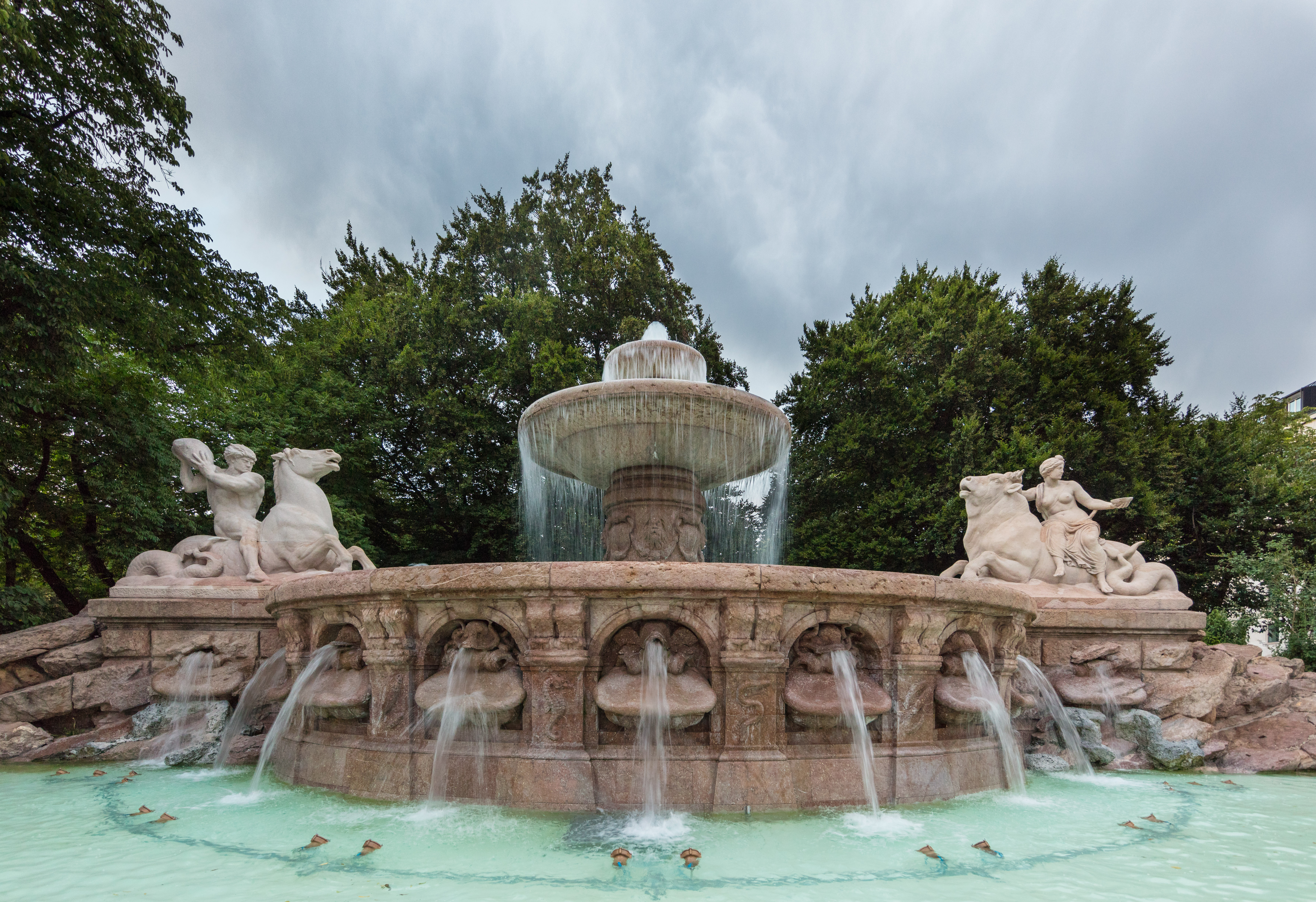
- Artist: Adolf von Hildebrand
- Year: 1893
- Medium: Untersberg marble, limestone
- Movement: Classicism
- Location: Munich, Bavaria, Germany
- 48°8′28.8″N 11°34′9.6″E

The Wittelsbacherbrunnen is a monumental fountain located on the northwestern edge of Munich's city center, at the transition between Lenbachplatz and Maximiliansplatz. Constructed between 1893 and 1895, it was designed by sculptor Adolf von Hildebrand in the Neo-Classicist style. The fountain serves as an allegory for the primal forces of water.

Due to its calm and clear design, as well as its integration into the urban environment, the Wittelsbacherbrunnen is regarded as one of the most artistically accomplished installations in Munich.

== History ==
In the early 19th century, there was a renewed interest in the aesthetic principles of classical antiquity, leading to a revival of Renaissance fountain design. As part of the redesign of the area between Karlsplatz and Maximiliansplatz—now Lenbachplatz—a new fountain was commissioned to be built on the remains of the former city wall.

The fountain was donated by the city of Munich to commemorate the completion of the city's water supply system in 1883, which sourced spring water from the Mangfall Valley. In 1889, a competition was held to design the fountain, and Adolf von Hildebrand's design was selected. The commission was contingent upon Hildebrand relocating to Munich. After nearly two years of work, with assistance from sculptor Erwin Kurz, the fountain was unveiled on June 12, 1895.

The Wittelsbacher Fountain was the first in a series of five monumental fountains designed by Hildebrand in Munich. During World War II, the fountain was severely damaged by air raids. After the war, it was restored by Theodor Georgii, a student of Hildebrand, and was reactivated on October 3, 1952.

The Wittelsbacher Fountain on Lenbachplatz should not be confused with another fountain of the same name located in the Fountain Courtyard of the Munich Residence.

== Design and architecture ==
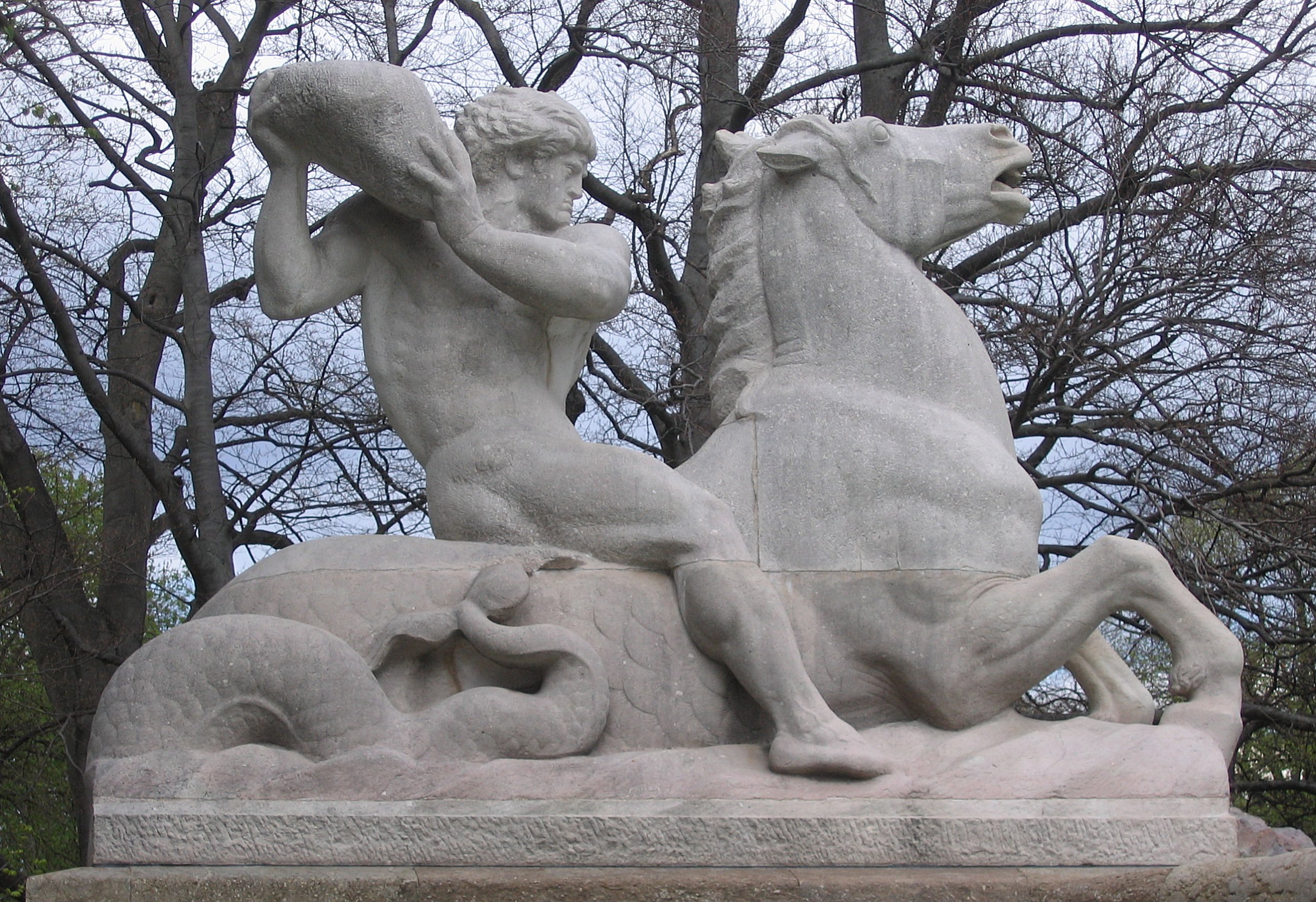
Allegory of the Destructive Power of Water.

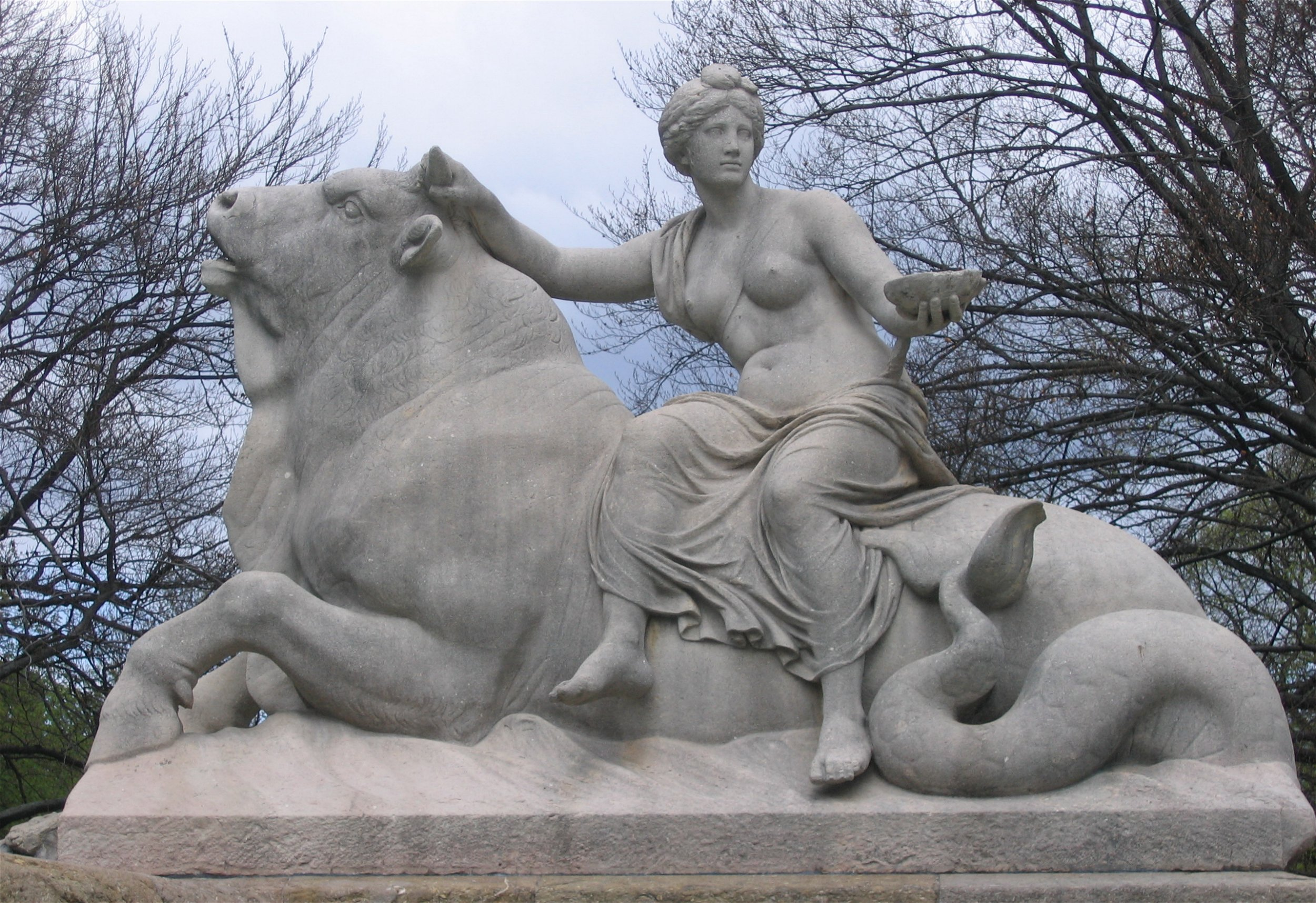
Allegory of the Creative Power of Water.

The fountain features a 25-meter-wide basin in the shape of a semicircle that curves toward the square. The rear of the basin is indented, with two rectangular extensions on either side. Rising from the basin is a central structure resembling a stylized rocky landscape, with a two-tiered limestone bowl featuring reliefs.

Flanking the central basin are two large sculptures made of Untersberger marble, which depict figures from classical mythology.

- The left sculpture portrays a young man riding a fish-tailed water horse emerging from the waves. He holds a boulder, poised to throw it, symbolizing the destructive power of water. This figure alludes to the untamed forces of mountain streams in the source area of Munich's water supply.
- The right sculpture features an Amazon seated on a fish-tailed water bull rising from the water. She extends a bowl of water toward the viewer, symbolizing the fertile and life-giving potential of water once it has been tamed and channeled for human use.

The fountain is illuminated around the clock, except on sunny days.
