= Damenstiftskirche St. Anna =

Chapel in Munich, Germany

Coordinates: 48°08′14″N 11°34′9″E

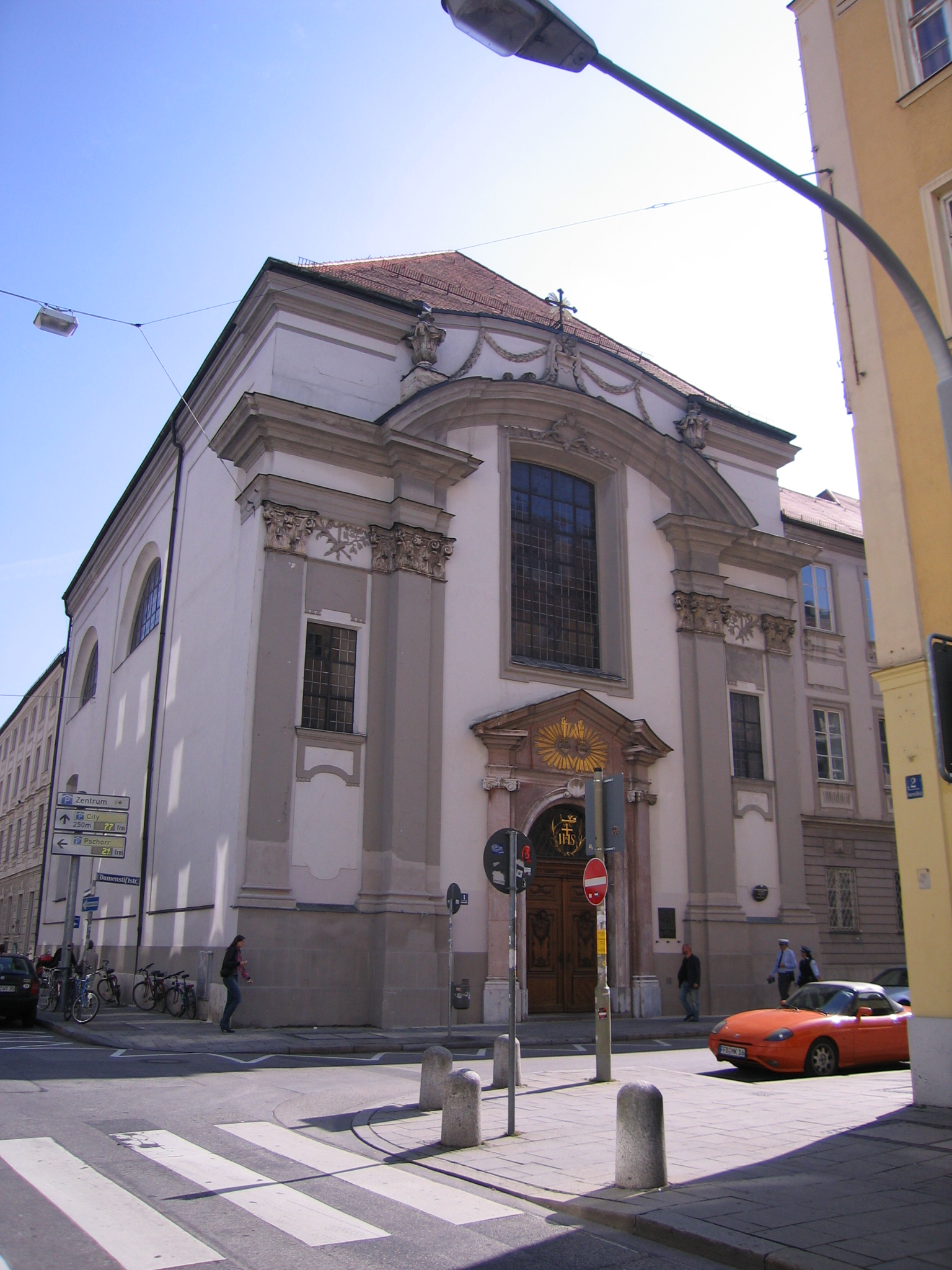
St Anna Damenstiftskirche

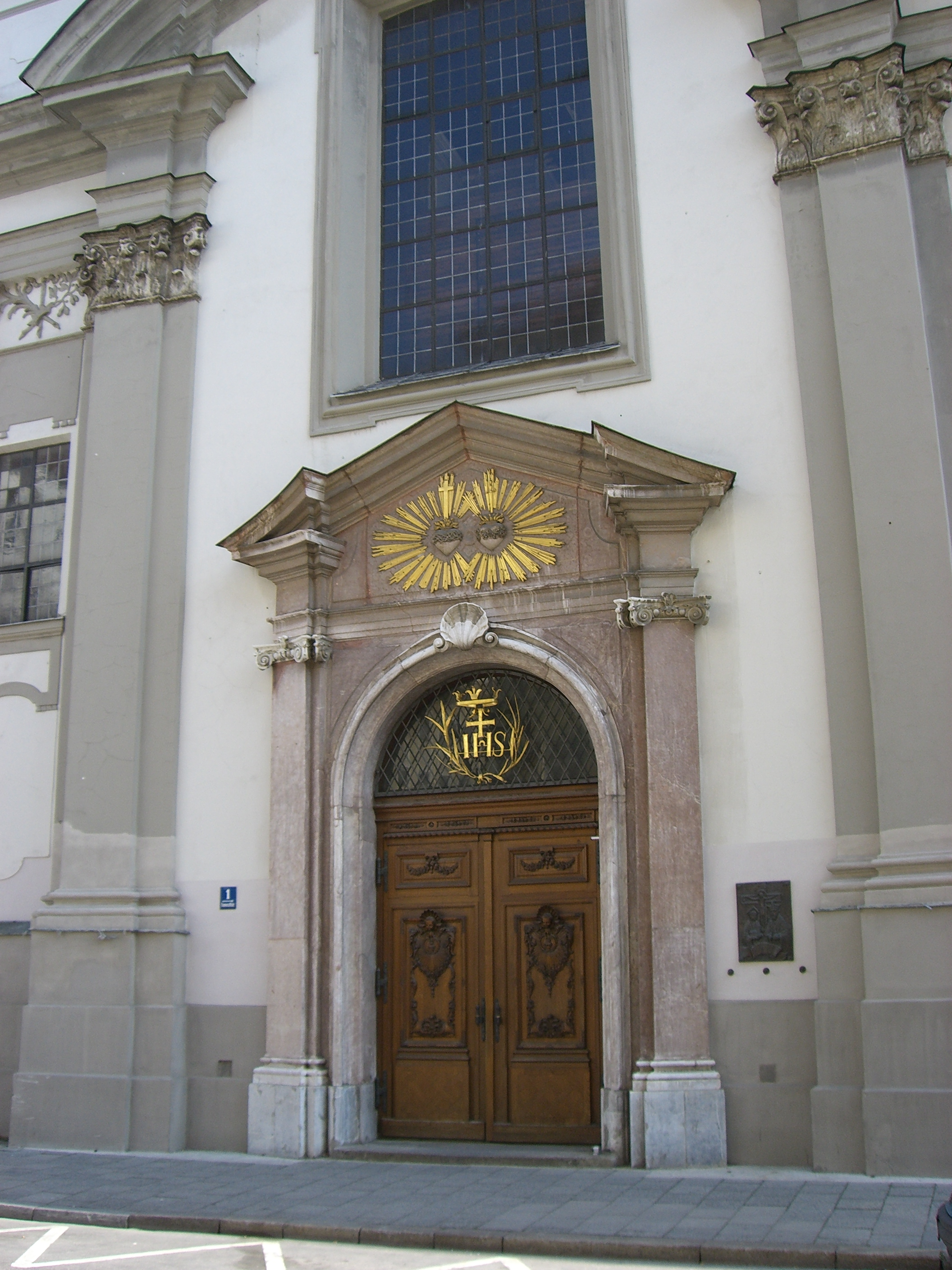
Entry to the church

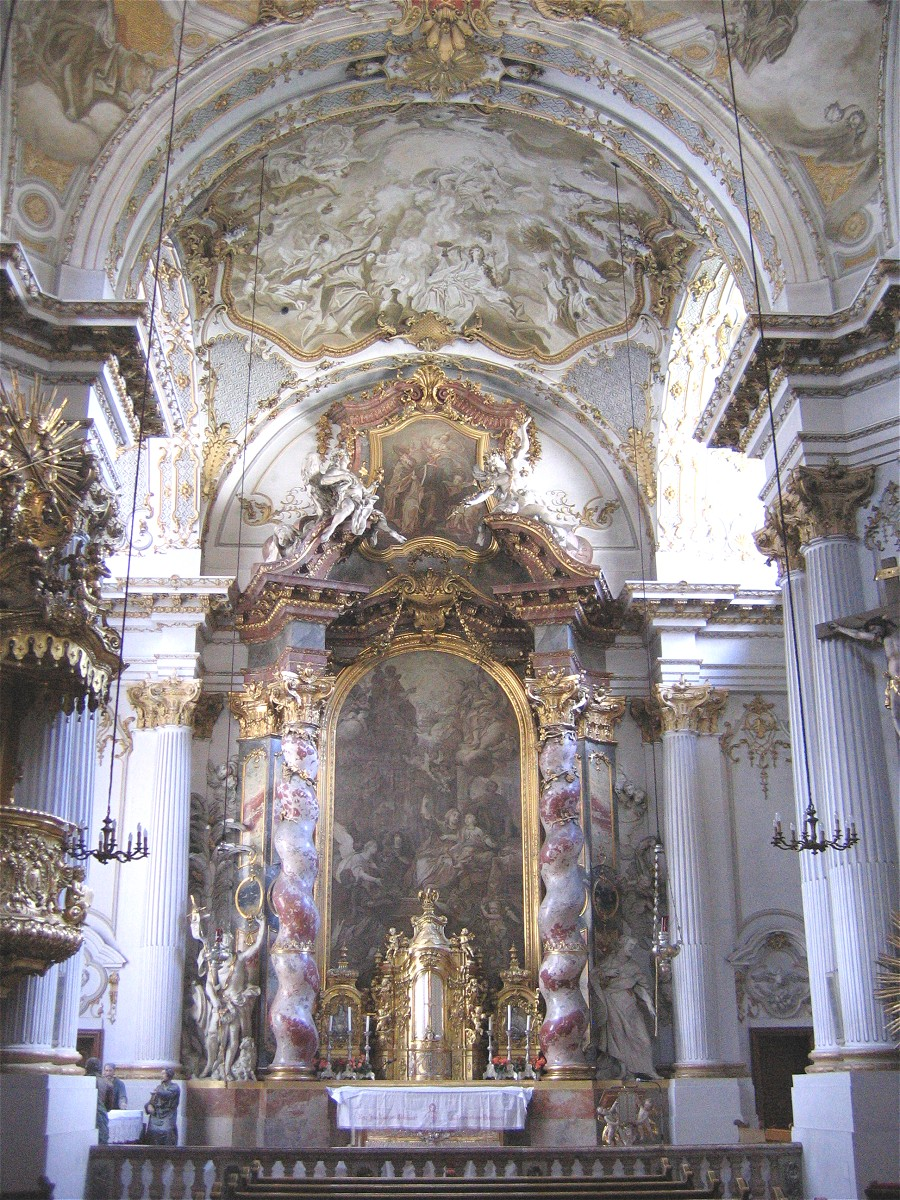
choir

Damenstiftskirche St. Anna is a chapel in Munich, southern Germany.

It was commissioned in the 18th century by Elector Charles Albert (later the Emperor Charles VII) and the cornerstone was laid in 1733. A monastery in the legal form of a chapter of nuns was set up. The architect was Johann Baptist Gunetzrhainer, while the Asam brothers were responsible for the interior. The women's collegiate church was consecrated in 1735.

All but the outer walls were destroyed in World War II. The interior was restored from old photographs in 1980, but the murals are now painted in black and white.

== FSSP Apostolate ==
On 1 September 2014, Reinhard Cardinal Marx, Metropolitan Archbishop of Munich and Freising, entrusted the chapel to the Priestly Fraternity of St Peter (FSSP) permanently.

Since this time, daily Mass has been offered in the Extraordinary Form of the Roman Rite, at the Chapel exclusively.

== Sources ==
As of this edit, this article uses content from "Chapter of Nuns Monastery Church St. Anna", which is licensed in a way that permits reuse under the Creative Commons Attribution-ShareAlike 3.0 Unported License, but not under the GFDL. All relevant terms must be followed.
