= Old Technical Town Hall =

Building in Munich, Germany

Coordinates: 48.1322°N 11.5708°E

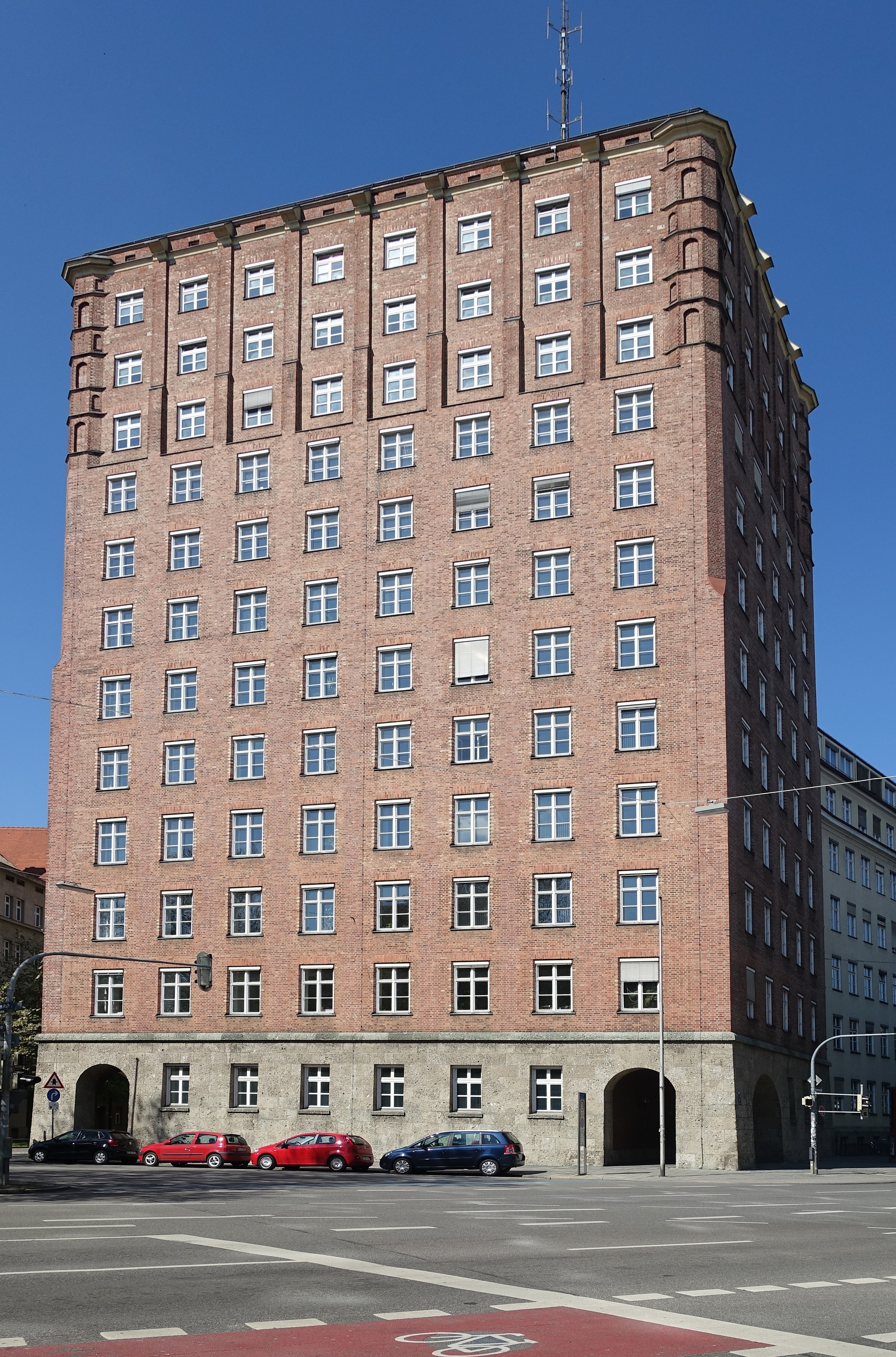
Old Technical Town Hall

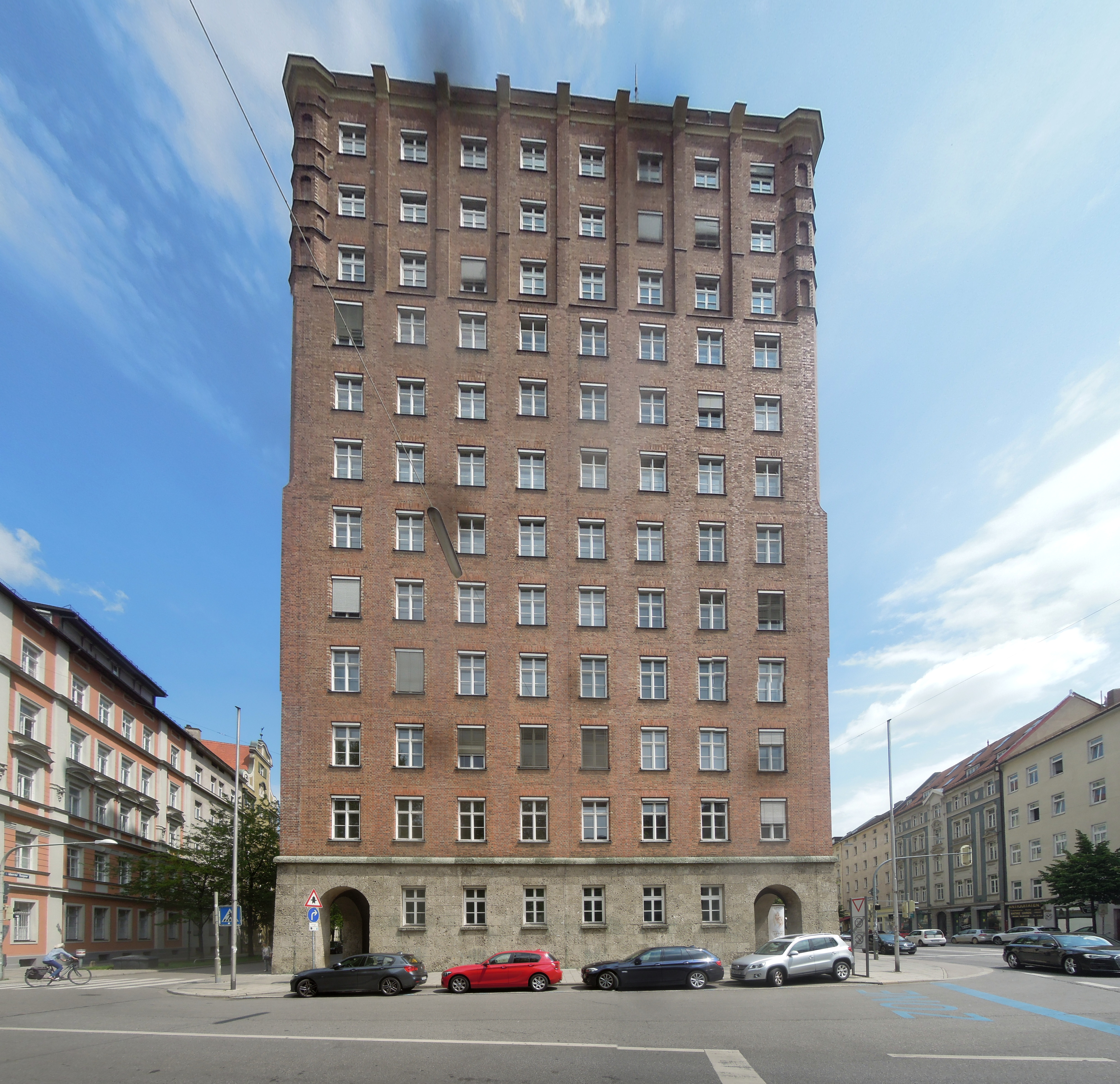
Front view

The Old Technical Town Hall (German: Altes Technisches Rathaus, officially Städtisches Hochhaus), is a communal service building of the city administration and headquarters of the section for the planning and building regulations of Munich, Bavaria, Germany. It is the oldest high-rise building in Munich and is still referred to as "Das Hochhaus" by old-established Munichers, although there are now more and higher high-rise buildings.

== Location ==
The Old Technical Town Hall (Blumenstraße 28b) is located in the historic old town south of the Sendlinger Tor at the Altstadtring / Blumenstraße, in junction with the "An der Hauptfeuerwache".

== History ==
The technical departments of the city administration Munich gained in importance, especially after World War I; which also meant an increase in the number of professionals and increased requirement of space. Within the framework of a competition for the development of the urban plot between Blumenstraße and Unterer Anger, which was launched in 1919, the idea arose to concentrate all technical departments in one building. Throughout the course of this competition an intensive discussion about a high-rise building in the center of Munich began. This discussion was concluded by the decision of the City Council on 1 February 1921, which permitted the construction of high-rise buildings, provided that the designs take the local environment into account and the high-rise is lower than the towers of the Frauenkirche (99 m).

Within the framework of the competition of 1919, Hermann Leitenstorfer received first prize for his design of the Technical Town Hall. Leitenstorfer increased its design for the municipal administration building from four to twelve stories. The building, which was now to be classified as a high-rise building, was permitted by the prize court to be executed in 1928, as they believed it would create a "welcome dominant focal point in the townscape".

In 1928, the foundation bricks were laid, and as early as 1929 the high-rise building could be handed over for its purpose. Together with the neighboring building, which begun in 1924, the Old Technical Town Hall created an organizational and structural, but not architectural, unit.

Soon, however, the technical departments of the city administration needed more rooms, therefore additional offices were erected outside the Old Technical Town Hall. Only with the opening of the Technical Town Hall in Berg am Laim in the year 2000 are all the technical services combined into one building complex. Since then, the building previously named "Städtisches Hochhaus", has been called the "Old Technical Town Hall" in the public consciousness and in the semi-official use.

== Building ==
The Old Technical Town Hall is architecturally divided into three units: the base, the eight main floors and the four stories, one of which is the attic.

The eight main floors are simply designed. The frameless window ribbons give the impression of a perforated facade. The upper floors are divided by flat buttresses, the edges are trimmed and have historicizing design elements. The attic, with its very prominent console stones incorporates the building structure visibly. In this way, the buildings completely clad covered bricks correspond with the Frauenkirche.

The stone trim in Nagelfluh, works well because of the art that it is formed, and how it simultaneously searches for a connection with the polygonal ends of the upper story of the building. This reminds Hermann Leitenstorfer of the Angertor, which was demolished in 1869, on the grounds which the high-rise building was erected.

Stylistically, the Old Technical Town Hall is assigned as a New Construction and is regarded as the most important example of Munich's options for New Constructions.

== Technical specifications ==
- Height: 45.5 m
- Stories: 12

== Others ==
The Old Technical Town Hall is still equipped with a popular paternoster elevator. Therefore, the "Association for the Rescue of the Last Passenger Elevators", which was founded in Munich, was able to make changes to the Elevator Regulations, which initially called for extra service station for the paternoster elevators as of 2004. The paternoster elevator was decommissioned on 29 May 2015, due to the new version of the Occupational Health and Safety Ordinance issued by the Federal Government on 1 June 2015. Due to violent protests, this portion of the regulation was withdrawn on 24 June 2015, and shortly thereafter, the paternoster was reopened.
