= Lenbachplatz =

Coordinates: 48°08′27″N 11°34′07″E

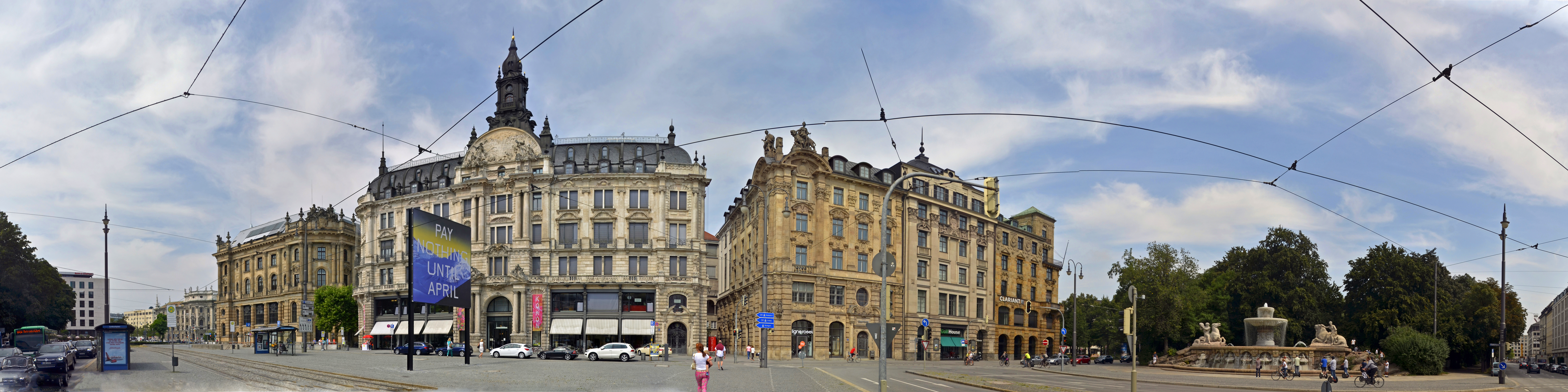
Panorama of the Lenbachplatz (West aspect)

Lenbachplatz is located in Maxvorstadt, Munich, Bavaria, Germany.
