= Holy Cross Church, Munich =

Church in Munich, Germany

Coordinates: 48°13′04″N 11°37′48″E

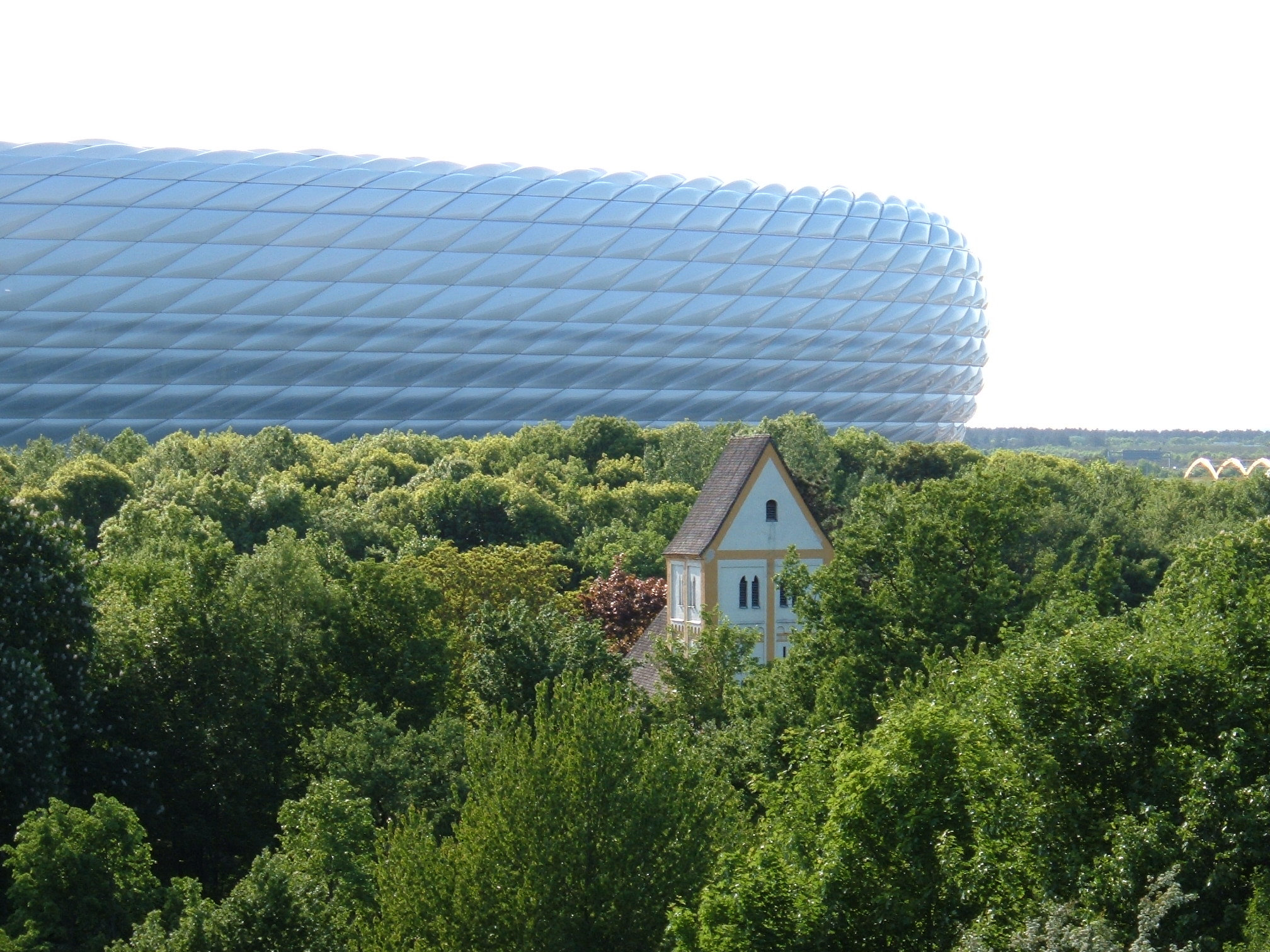
Holy Cross Church with Allianz Arena

The Holy Cross Church (German: Heilig-Kreuz-Kirche) is a Catholic church in the Fröttmaning district of Munich (Germany). It is now the oldest preserved church in the city as Fröttmaning has been a part of Munich since 1931.

== History ==
The history of the church begins before 815, when the village of Fröttmaning was first mentioned officially (ad Freddamaringun; in loco Freddimaringa). A deed of donation in connection with the church from the year 815 is the oldest document in the Bavarian State Archive. The Fröttmaning noble Situli at that time had offered a wooden church, together with the farmland, to the Freising bishopric, which was consecrated by Bishop Hitto of Freising. Today's late Romanesque building with its thick walls was built for the most part at the beginning of the 13th century. The Church of the Holy Cross is one of the churches with steeple above the choir which was typical for the Bishopric of Freising at that time. The Romanesque spire with round arch windows and frieze is eighteen meters high, the church itself is fifteen meters long and nearly seven meters wide. The battlement with its embrasures is still visible in the inner wall. Particularly rare and unique in Germany are the Romanesque frescoes painted directly on the red bricks of the interior with lime paint, which were discovered only in 1981 during renovations and then partly exposed. The painted circles around a tree of life symbolize the sun. One of the wall paintings is the oldest representation of Christ in Bavaria. The rest of the church is predominantly from the baroque period. The ceiling fresco painted by pupils of the Asam brothers around 1740, it shows the worship of the Holy Cross.

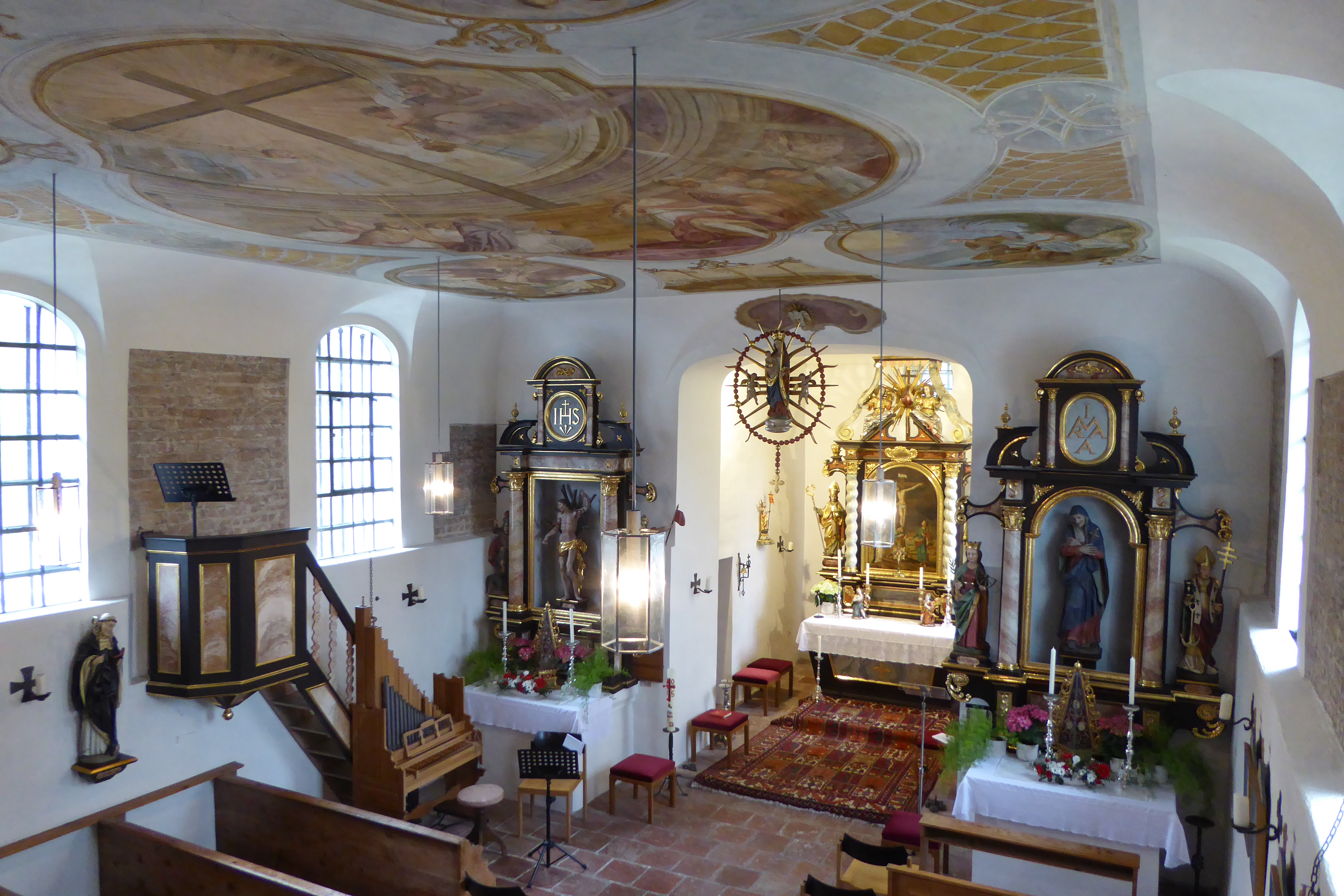
Interior of the church

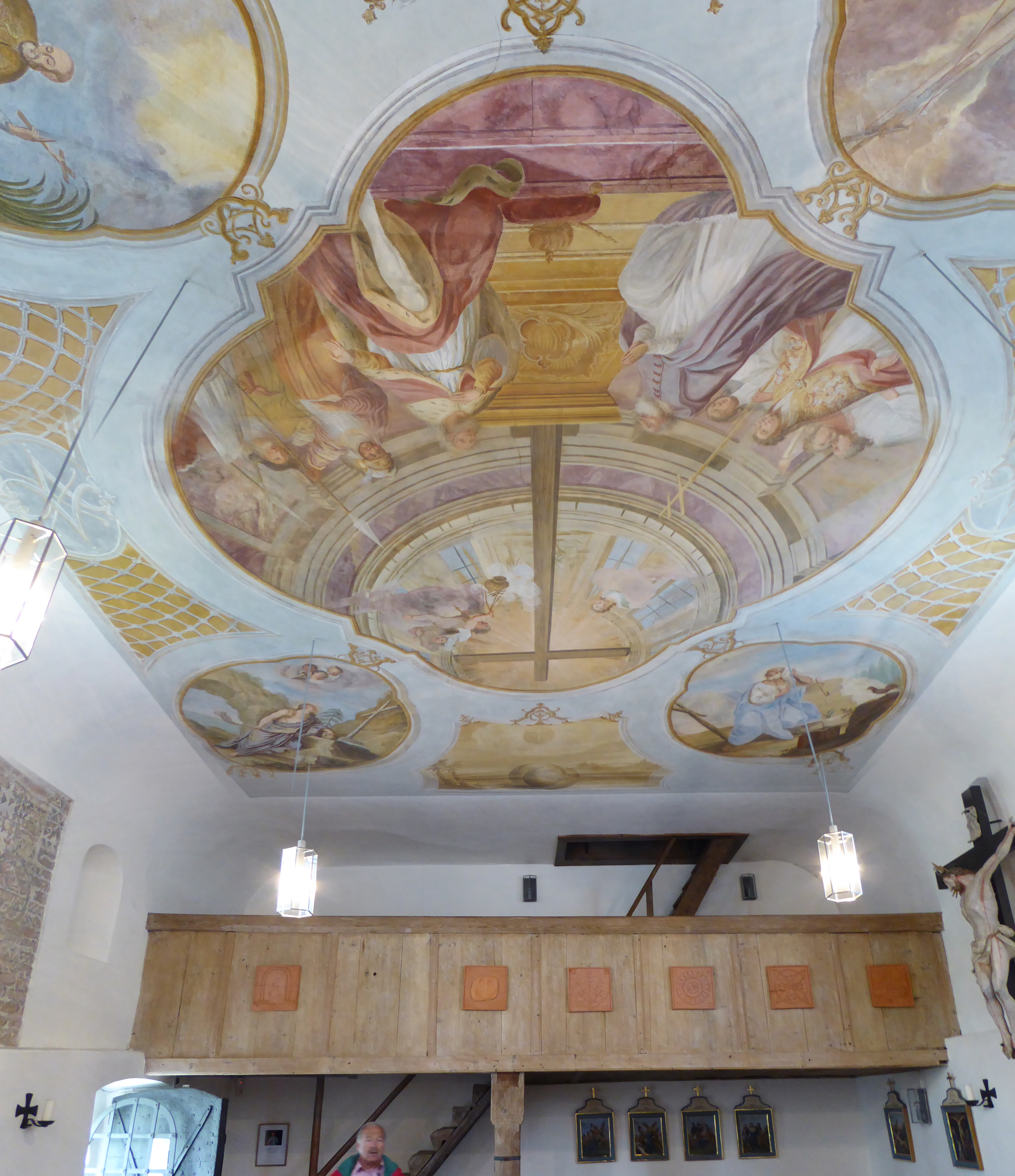
Fresco

== Sunken village ==
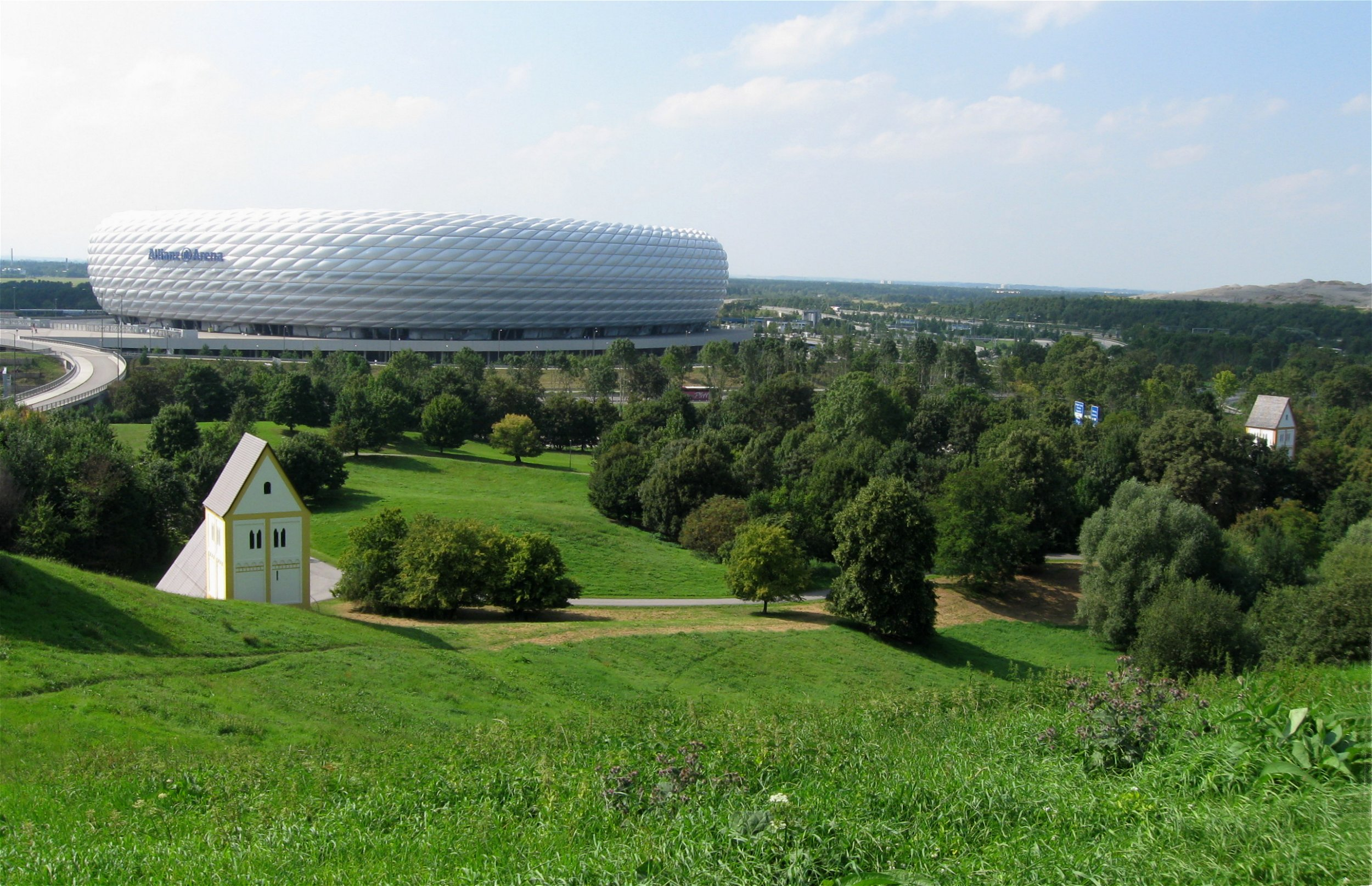
The „Sunken village“ replica on the left and the Holy Cross Church on the right, with the Allianz Arena in the background

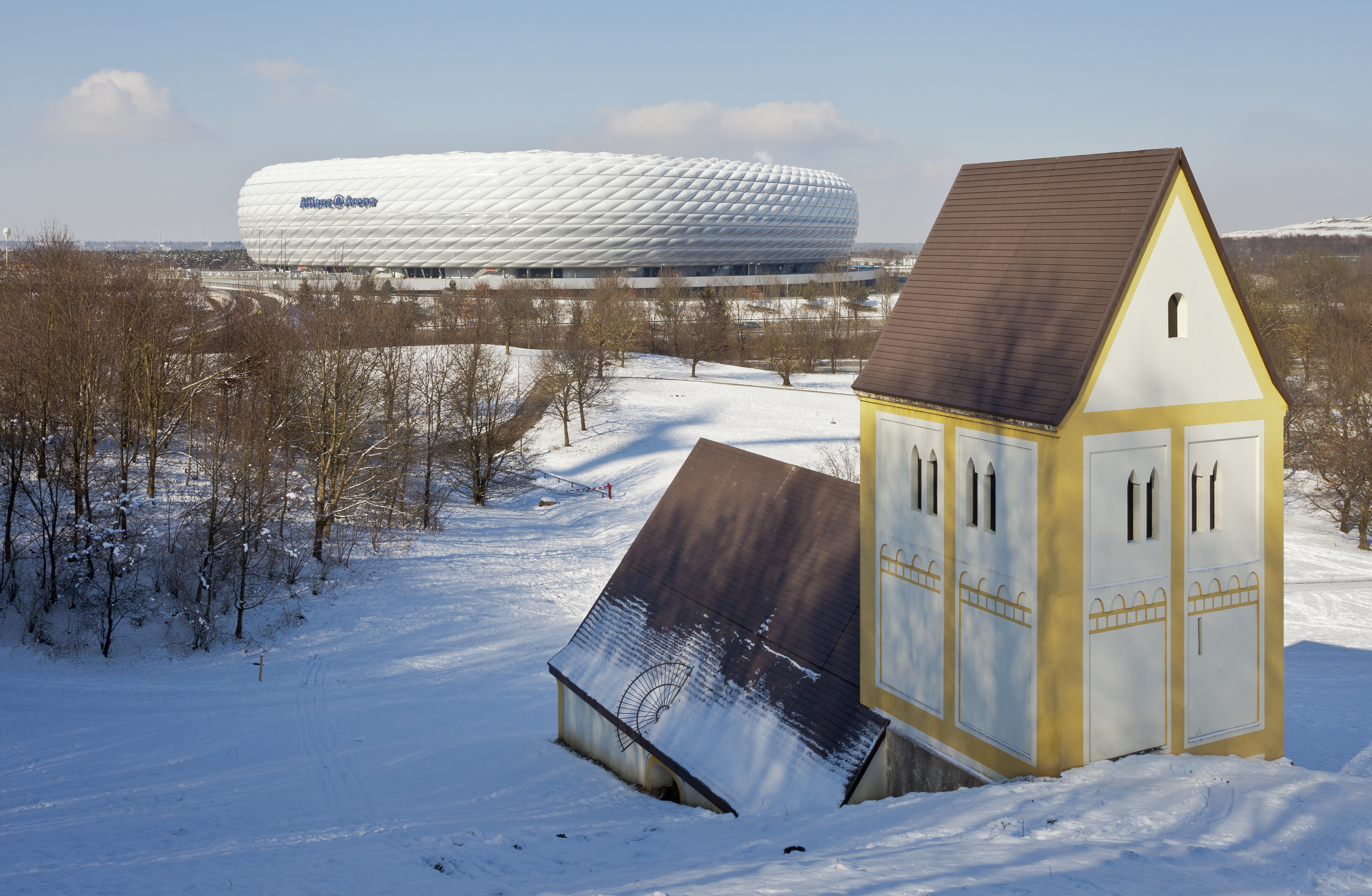
The „Sunken village“ in winter

With the construction of the nearby Allianz Arena, an international competition for an artwork was initiated which was won by Timm Ulrichs. The focus was on the disappearance of the former village of Fröttmaning. Approximately 150 meters south of the Holy Cross Church, in 2006, an inaccessible replica of the Romanesque church was created in original size from painted precast concrete parts. The surreal-melancholic work of art "sunken village" at the foot of the Fröttmaning mountain of rubble is a kind of a loss display, the disappearing in this place. The copy was arranged in such a way that the building seems half buried from the mountain.

== Literature ==
- Bernd Meier, Kirchenverwaltung und Pfarrgemeinderat St. Albert, ed. (1990), Heilig Kreuz Fröttmaning 815–1990. Als Jubiläumsband herausgegeben anläßlich der 1175-Jahr-Feier (in German), o. O. [München]: Selbstverlag
- Jakob Wetzel: Im Nirgendwo: Heilig Kreuz ist die wahrscheinlich älteste, ganz sicher aber die erstaunlichste Kirche im Münchener Stadtgebiet. An diesem Wochenende feiert sie ihr 1200-jähriges Jubiläum, in: Süddeutsche Zeitung, 17. April 2015, Seite R5.
