= Johann Baptista Ruffini =

Johann Baptista Ruffini (1672 – 16 June 1749) was an important salt trader in Bavaria. In addition to being involved in trade, he was involved in manufacturing in Munich where he also founded a bank.

He was born in Meran. He married Maria Johann Unertl (1689–1768), a sister of the Privy Council Chancellor and Conference Minister Franz Xaver Josef Freiherr von Unertl and niece of the Traunstein salt administrative officer Johann Zacharias von Mezger, Edler von Meggenhoven.

His son-in-law was Lieutenant Field Marshal, War Council Director, and Privy Councillor Jean-Gaspard Reichsgraf Basselet von La Rosée. His grandson was the President of the Electoral Bavarian Upper Court of Appellation, Aloys Reichsgraf Basselet von La Rosée.

Ruffini was elevated Electoral Bavarian Court Chamber Councillor and Imperial Privy Councillor. In 1720, he was ennobled in Vienna. He is remembered through the Ruffini House at Munich's Rindermarkt, named after the Ruffini tower which he bought in 1708. He died in Munich, and his tombstone is at the outer wall of St. Peter's Church in Munich.

The present-day head of the family, Enno Freiherr von Ruffin, has been married to Greek singer Vicky Leandros.
