= Johann Kaspar Basselet von La Rosée =

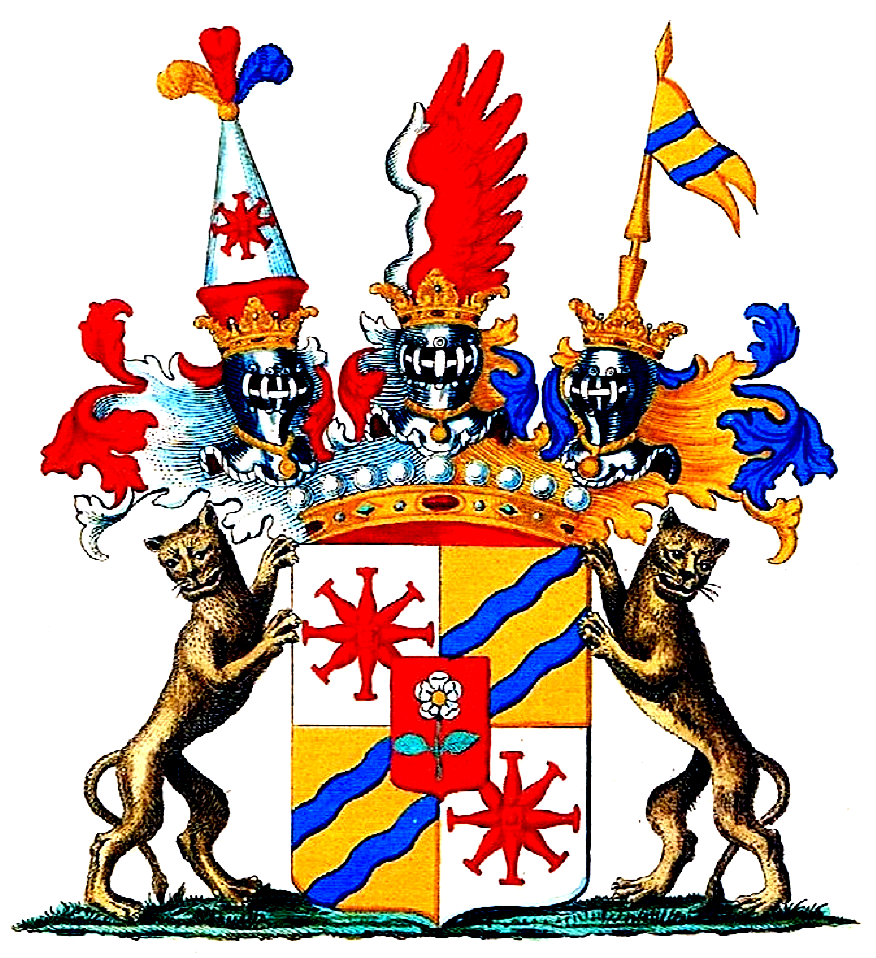
Coat of arms of the Counts Basselet von La Rosée

Johann Kaspar (Jean-Gaspard) Reichsgraf Basselet von La Rosée (30 April 1710 – 12 April 1795) was a leading Bavarian general.

Basselet von La Rosée was born at Arlon, Duchy of Luxembourg. Advancing his career in the army of his new fatherland Bavaria, his positions included electoral Privy Councillor, Lieutenant Field Marshal and Director of the War Council.

In 1761, he was appointed an honorary member of the Bavarian Academy of Sciences and Humanities, in 1764 created an Imperial Count (title recognized in Bavaria in 1766). In approximately 1760, he purchased the villages of Feldafing and Possenhofen as well as Rose Island, thus becoming the owner of the longest connected waterfront of Lake Starnberg. In 1834, his heirs sold the whole property to Duke Maximilian in Bayern, while King Ludwig I became proprietor of the island.

In 1770, Count Basselet von La Rosée purchased the estate of Mauern near Moosburg.

He died, aged 84, in Munich. His tomb can still be found in the vault chapel of the Counts La Rosée in Inkofen, today part of Haag an der Amper.

He was married to a daughter of the salt trader Johann Baptista Ruffini, who was at the same time a niece of the Bavarian State Chancellor Franz Xaver Josef von Unertl. His son was the electoral Bavarian chamberlain, Privy Councillor and President of the High Court of Appellation Aloys Reichsgraf Basselet von La Rosée.
