= Gabriel von Seidl =

German architect (1848–1913)

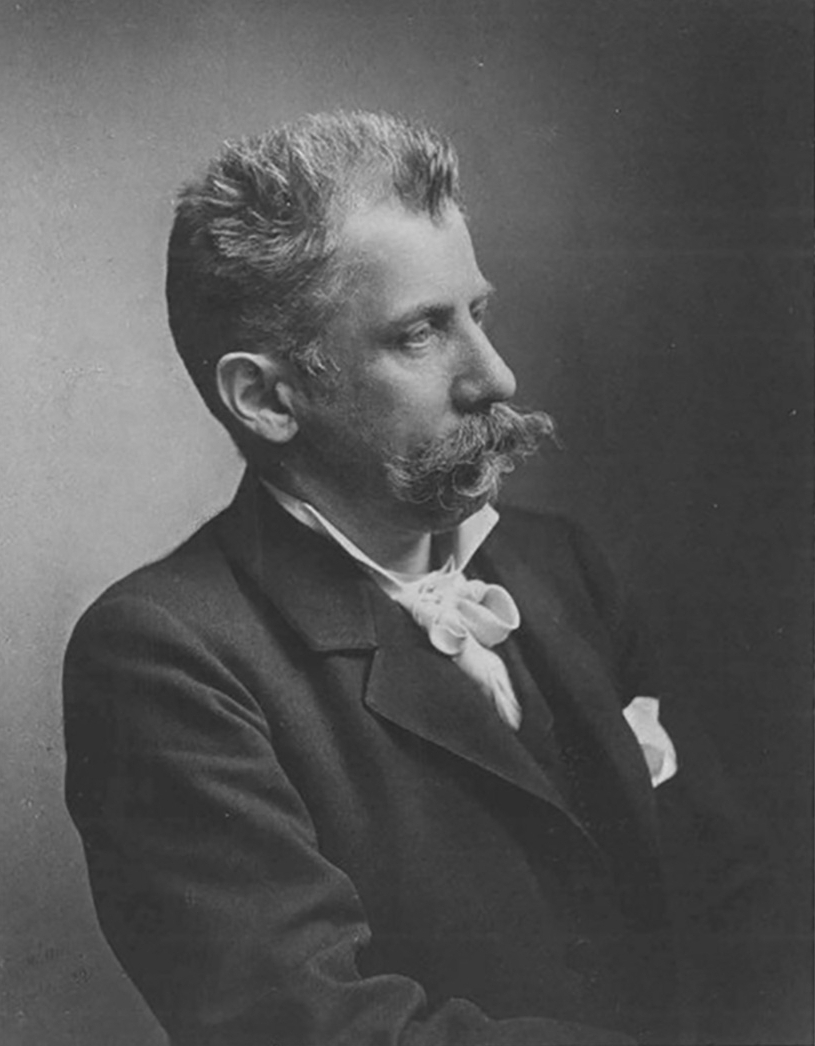
- Photograph by Theodor Hilsdorf.
- Born: 9 December 1848; Munich, Kingdom of Bavaria, German Confederation
- Died: 27 April 1913 (aged 64); Munich, Kingdom of Bavaria, German Empire
- Resting place: Alter Südfriedhof, Munich, Germany
- Education: Technical University of Munich; Academy of Fine Arts, Munich
- Occupations: Mechanical engineer, architect, interior designer, conservationist
- Style: Historicist
- Spouse: Franziska Neunzert (m. 1890)
- Children: 5
- Relatives: Emanuel von Seidl (1856–1919, brother; architect, interior designer, engineer); Gabriel von Sedlmayr (1850–1931, cousin; entrepreneur)
- Awards: Order of Merit of the Bavarian Crown; Pour le mérite

Gabriel von Seidl (9 December 1848 – 27 April 1913) was a German architect and a representative of the historicist style of architecture.

== Early life, education and early career ==
Gabriel Seidl was born in 1848 in Munich, Kingdom of Bavaria. He was the first son of the wealthy baker Anton Seidl and his wife, Therese, daughter of the brewer Gabriel Sedlmayr.

Seidl initially studied mechanical engineering at the Technical University of Munich (TUM). He then worked as a mechanical engineer in England, where he found that his real talent lay in the field of architecture. Consequently, he began studying at the Academy of Fine Arts in Munich. His studies were interrupted during 1870–1871 due to his volunteer participation in the Franco-Prussian War. After an extended period of study in Rome, he opened an interior decoration studio in 1878.

== Career ==
Seidl was a member of the Bavarian Arts and Crafts Association, founded in 1851, and quickly won the admiration of its members, including Lorenz Gedon, Rudolf von Seitz, and Fritz von Miller.

From 1866, Seidl, like his cousin Gabriel Ritter von Sedlmayr, was a member of the Corps Germania Munich. Not only was he a faithful corps brother till his death, he also drew the plans for the construction of the corps house, overseeing the progress of the work personally.

In 1900, Seidl was awarded the Order of Merit of the Bavarian Crown. Thereby, he was raised to the peerage and became Ritter von Seidl.

In 1902, von Seidl founded the Isartalverein (Isar Valley Association), and the Who's Who of the elite Munich culture establishment soon joined. The association worked for the preservation of the natural beauty of the Isar valley. The Isartalverein was founded in order to prevent further destruction of the Isar valley after the establishment of the first power plants in the Isar Valley by the electric power company Isarwerke GmbH.

In 1903 and 1904, the first mass protests against grand engineering projects that altered ecosystems were recorded in Germany. These mass protests were publicly supported by members of the Wilhelmine elite, such as Werner Sombart, and Max Weber. The Bund Heimatschutz (abbreviated BHU, Federation Homelandprotection) was, like the National Trust in Britain, assembled to appeal to as many Germans as possible. Theodor Fischer and von Seidl joined the BHU as Munich city planners and architects.

In 1908, he was awarded the Pour le Mérite. Seidl was made an honorary citizen of Speyer on 14 April 1909 because of his construction of a new building for the Historical Museum of the Palatinate in Speyer. In 1913, he was made an honorary citizen of Munich.

== Personal life ==
In 1890, Seidl married Franziska Neunzert, the daughter of a forester. Five children were born.

His brother Emanuel von Seidl was also an architect, but because his work focused mainly on private residential buildings, he is not as well known today.

=== Death ===
Seidl died in 1913 in his residential and office building in Munich. Gabriel von Seidl is buried at the Alter Südfriedhof in Munich.

== Honors ==
- Honorary curator of the Bavarian National Museum
- Honorary member of the Academy of Fine Arts, Munich
- Royal Bavarian professor
- Honorary doctorate from the Technical University of Munich
- Honorary Citizen of the city of Munich
- Honorary citizen of the city of Speyer
- Honorary citizen of the town of Bad Tölz

== Legacy ==
Gabriel von Seidl is the namesake of the Gabriel-von-Seidl-Gymnasium in Bad Tölz. Streets or squares are named after him in Bremen, Gräfelfing, Grünwald, Nuremberg, Pullach, and Worms. The Isartalverein erected a commemorative pillar in his memory in Pullach in 1922.

== Selected works ==
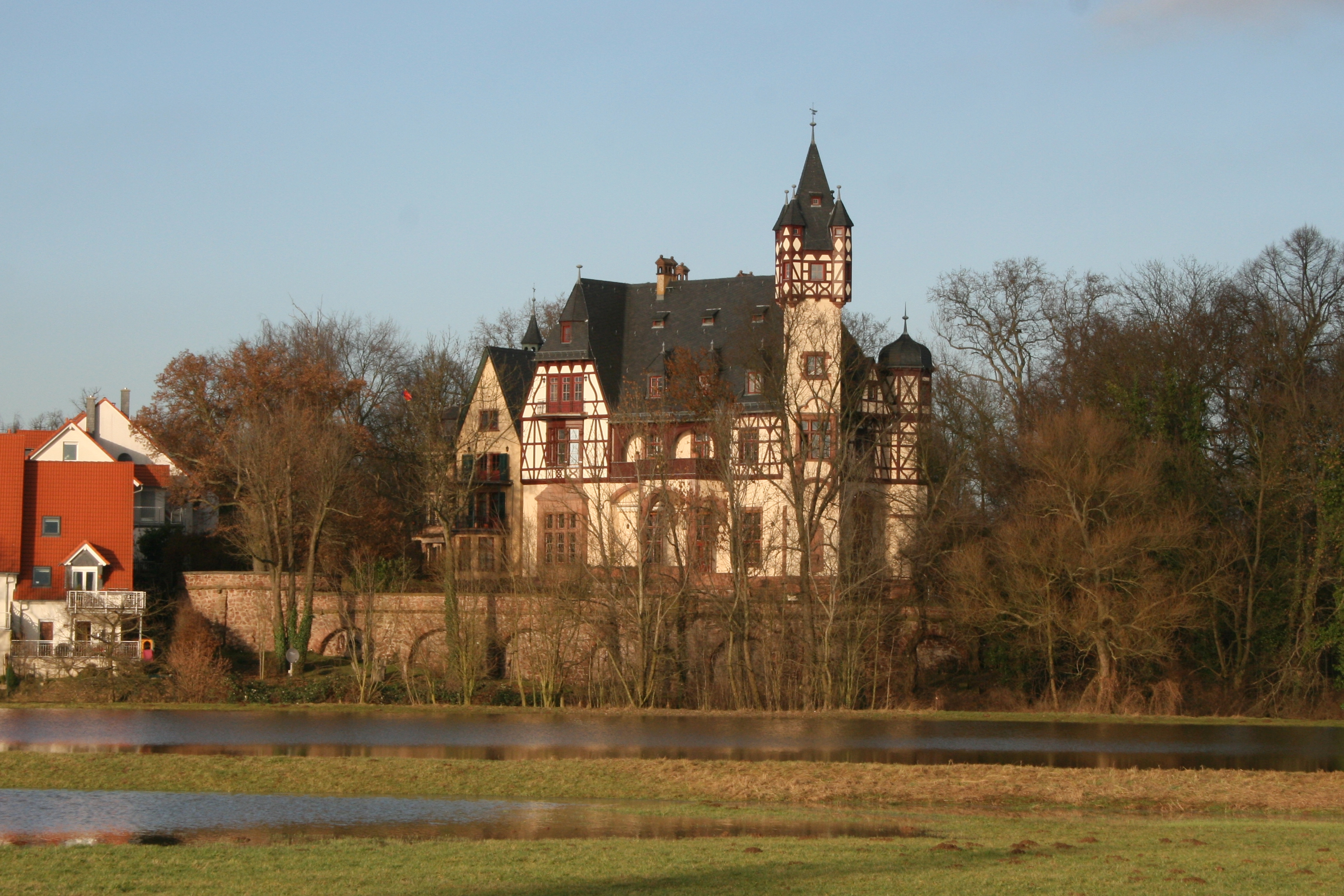
New Castle Büdesheim, Büdesheim (Schöneck), 1885

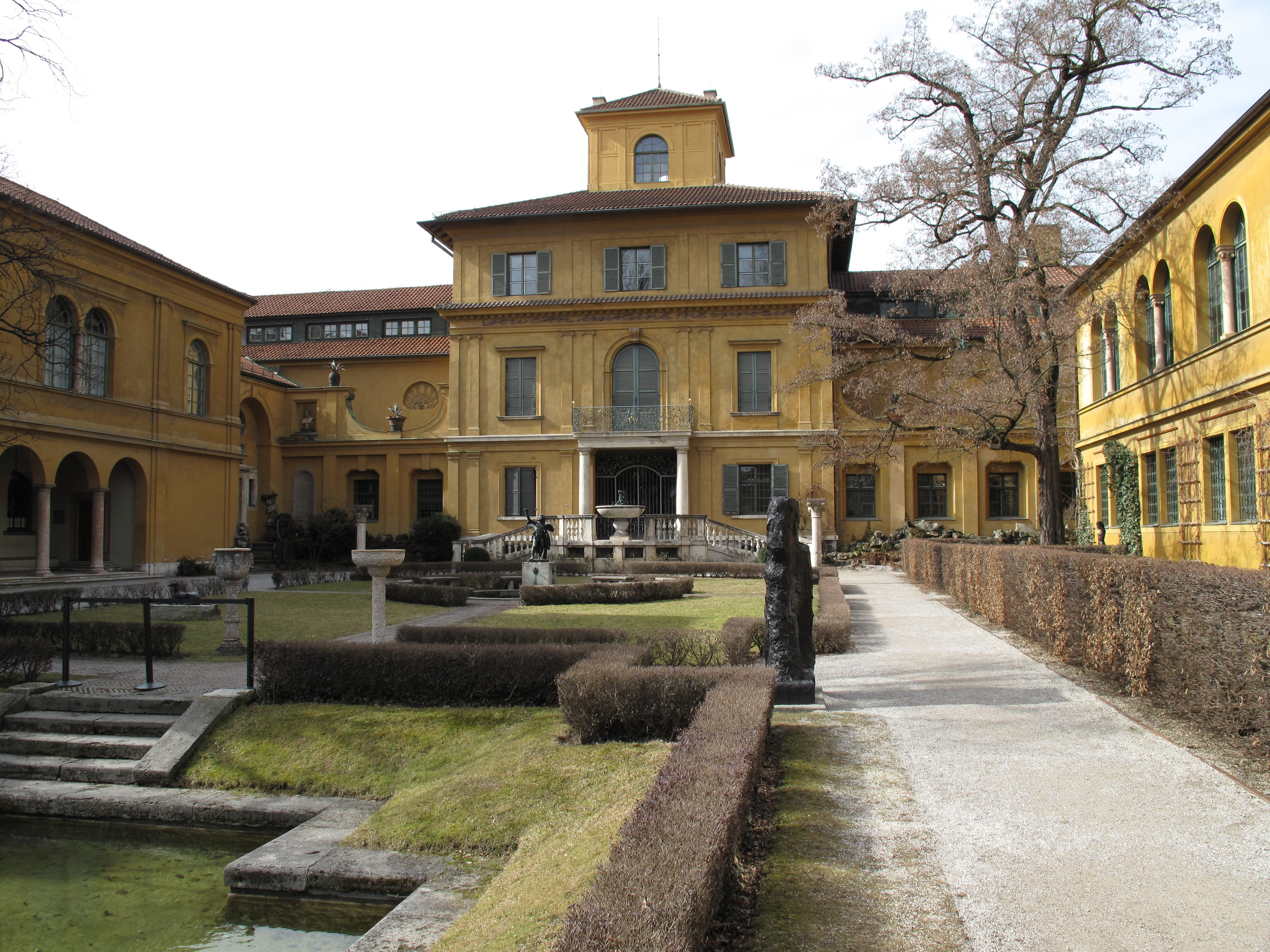
Lenbach Villa, Munich, 1887–1891

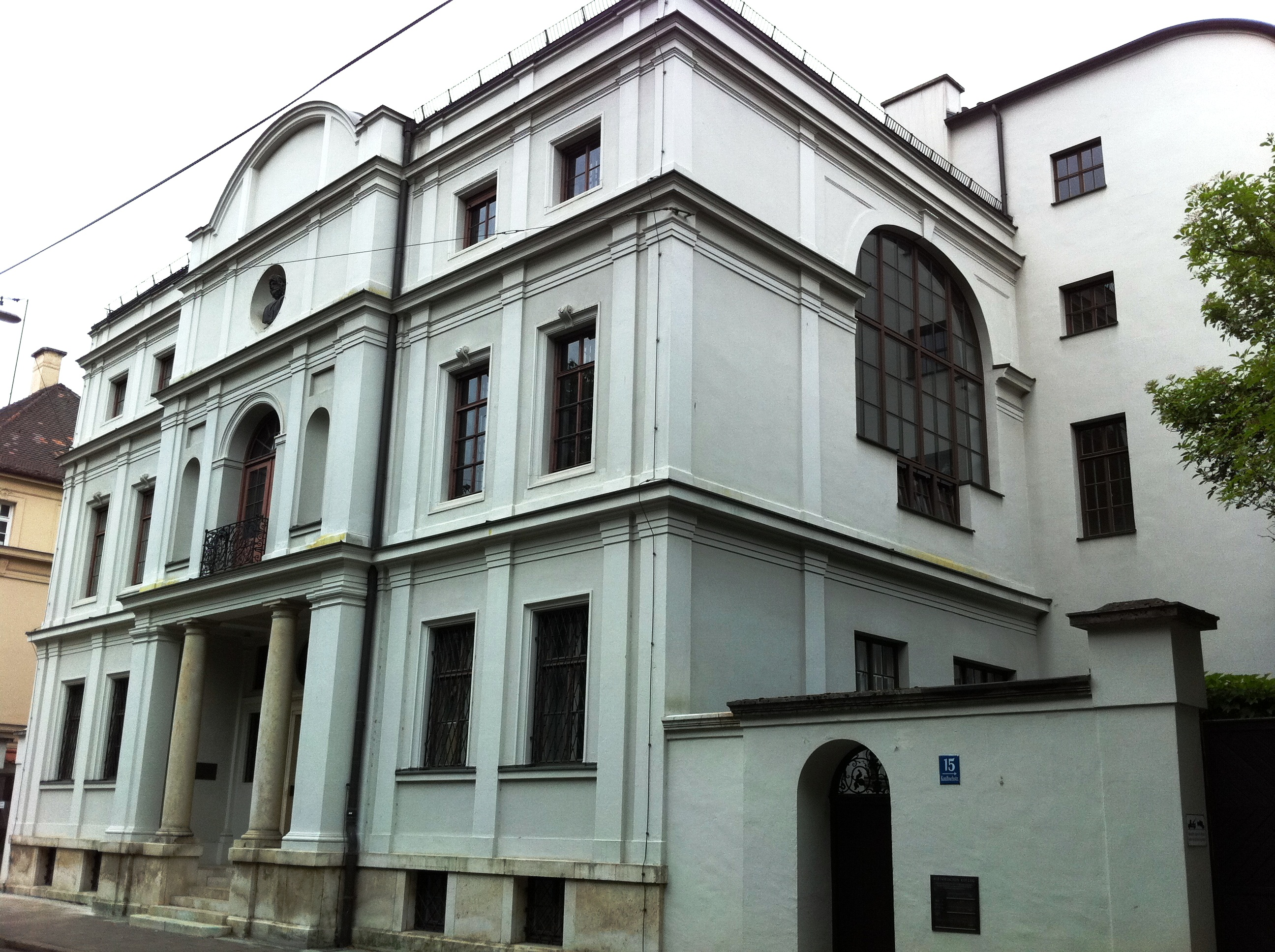
Villa of the painter Friedrich August von Kaulbach, Munich, 1887–1889

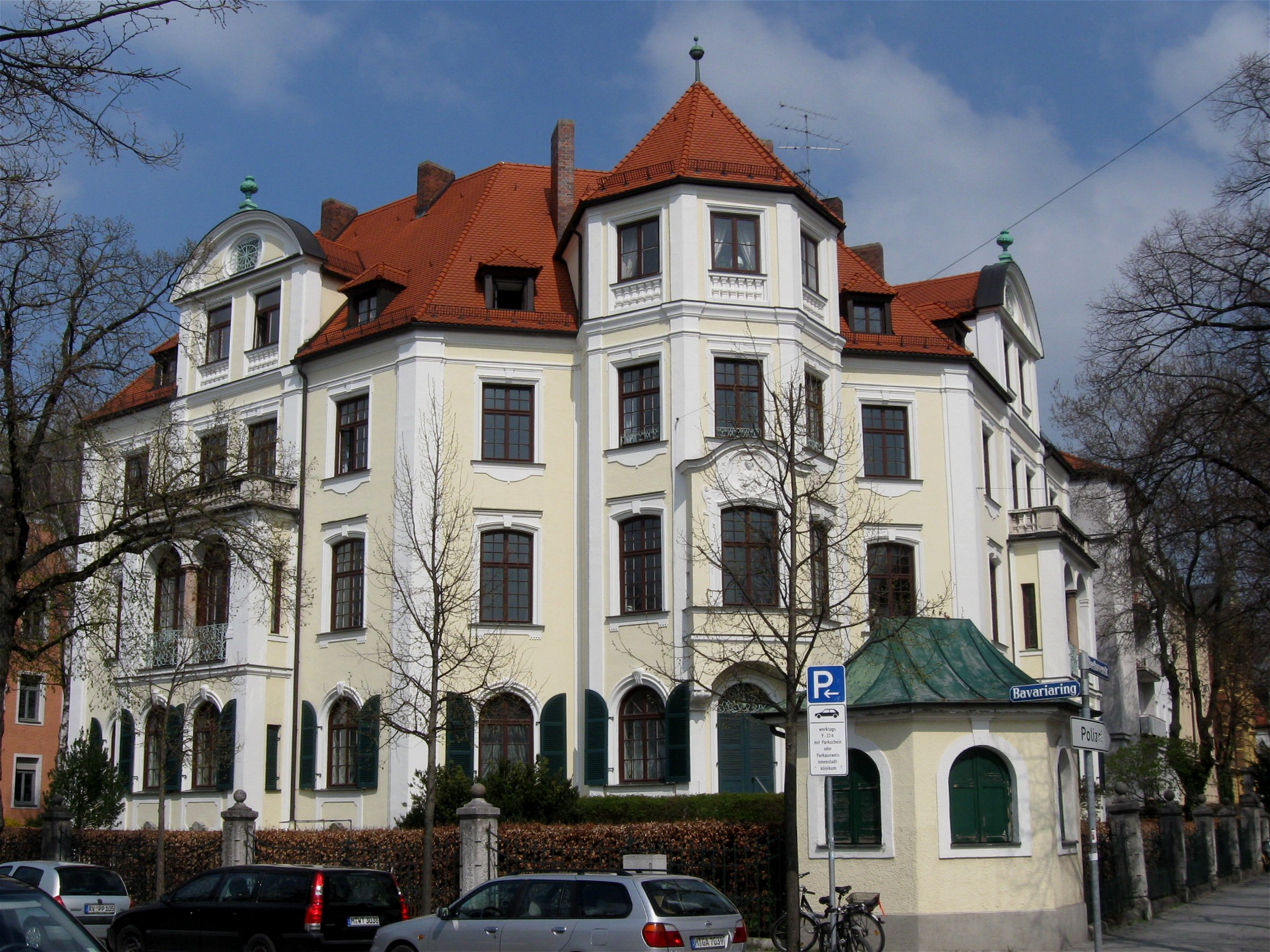
House on Bavariaring 24, Munich, 1888

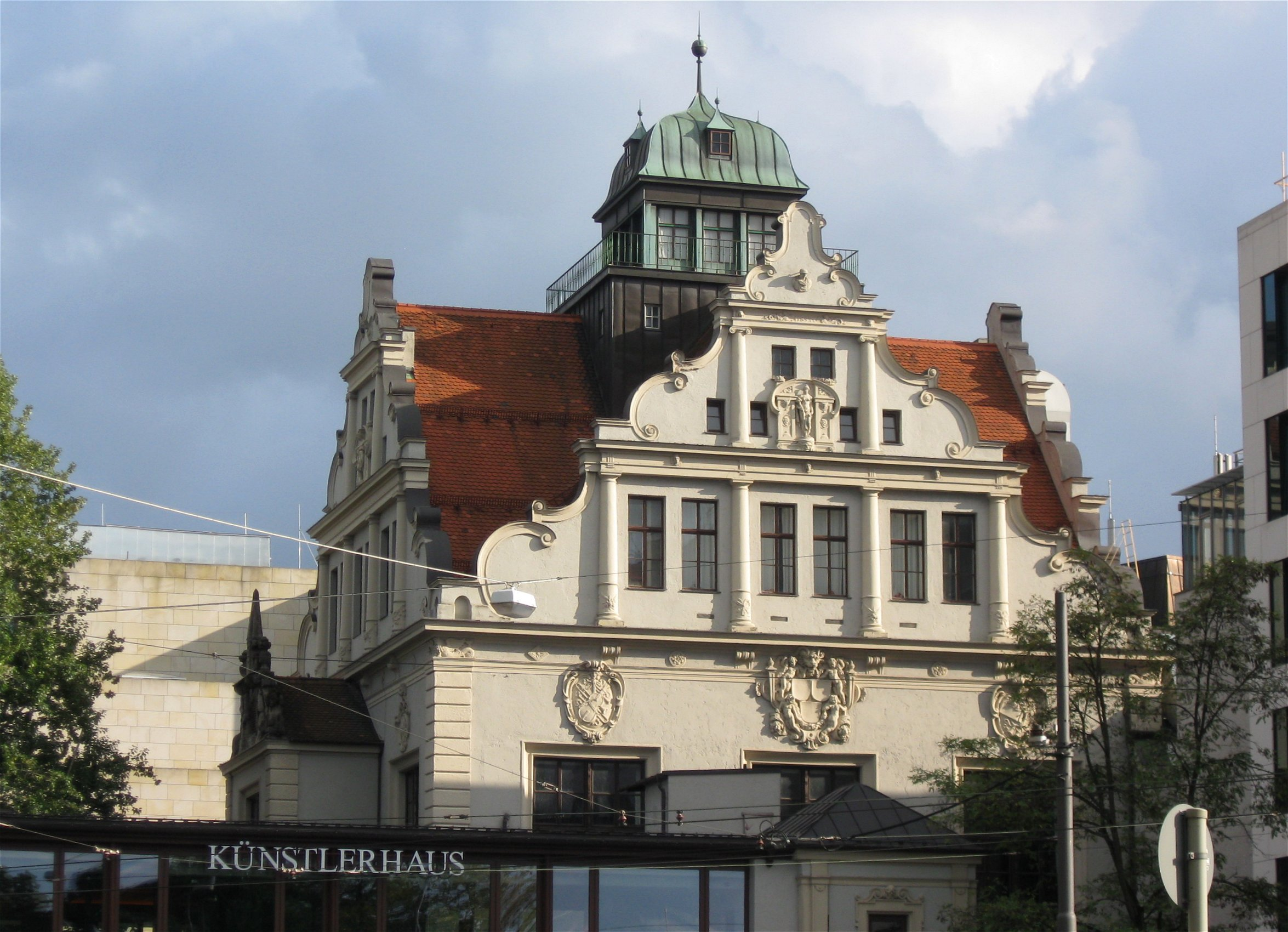
Künstlerhaus ("Artists' House") at Lenbachplatz, Munich, 1893–1900

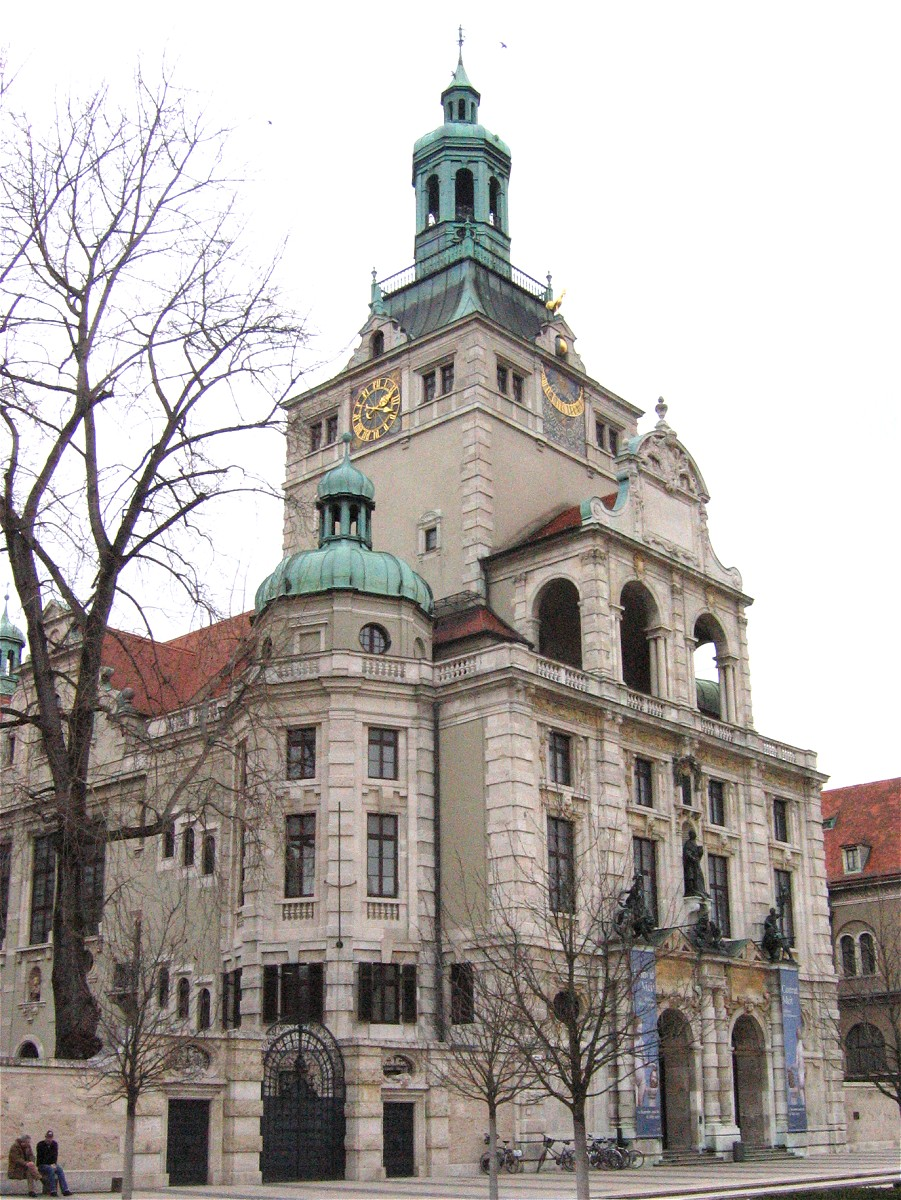
Bavarian National Museum, Munich, 1894–1899

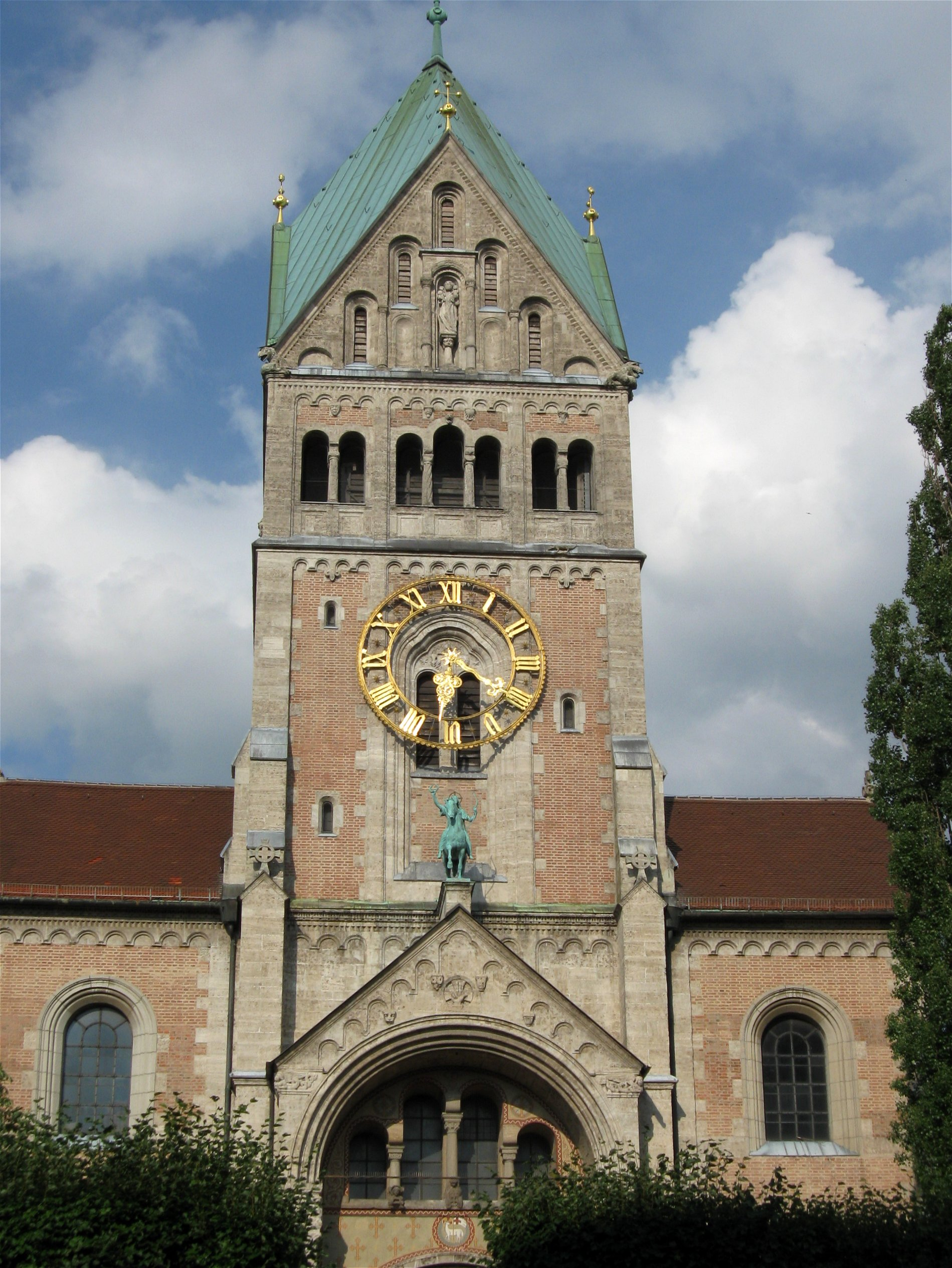
St. Anna's Church, Lehel, Munich, 1887–1892

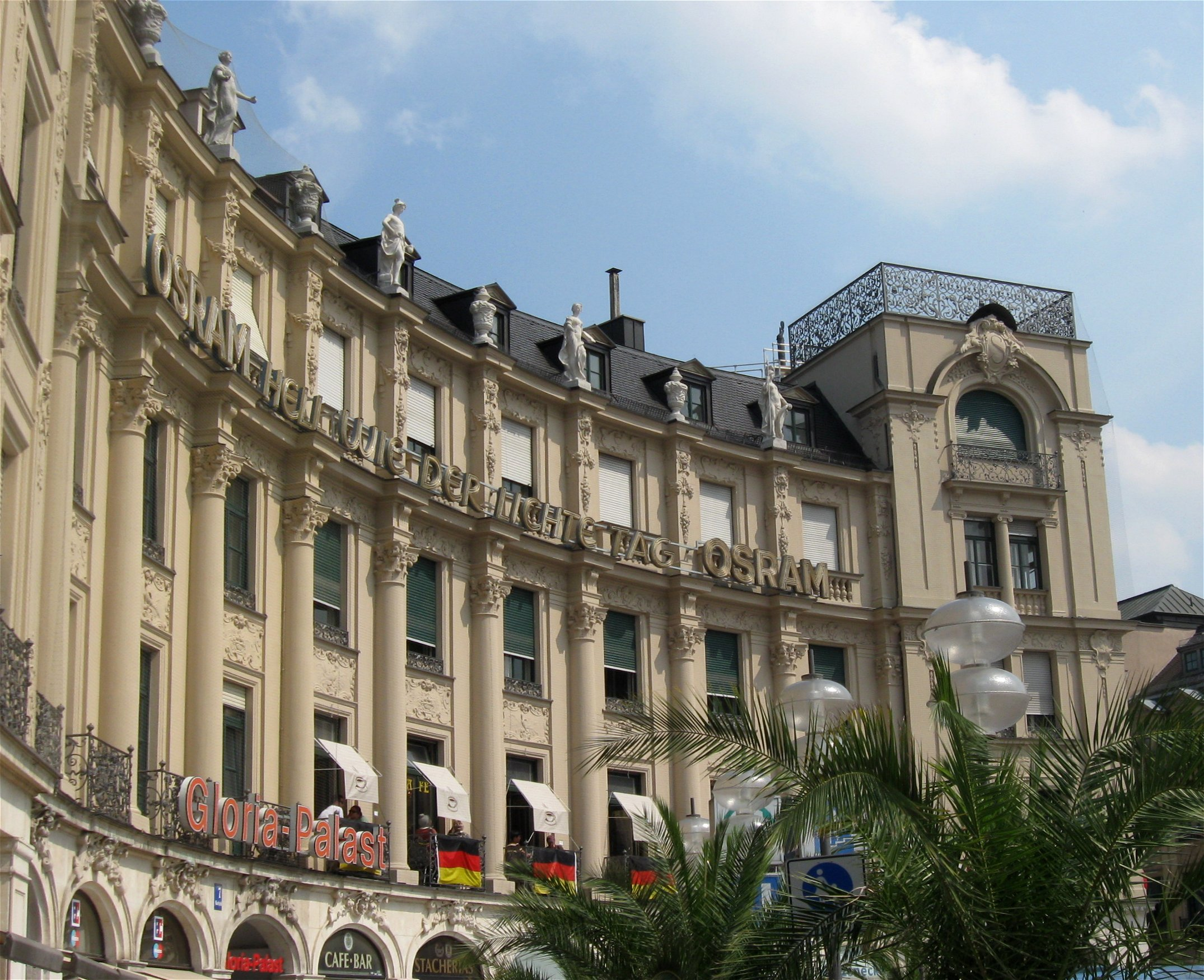
Rondell buildings at Karlsplatz, Munich, 1899–1900

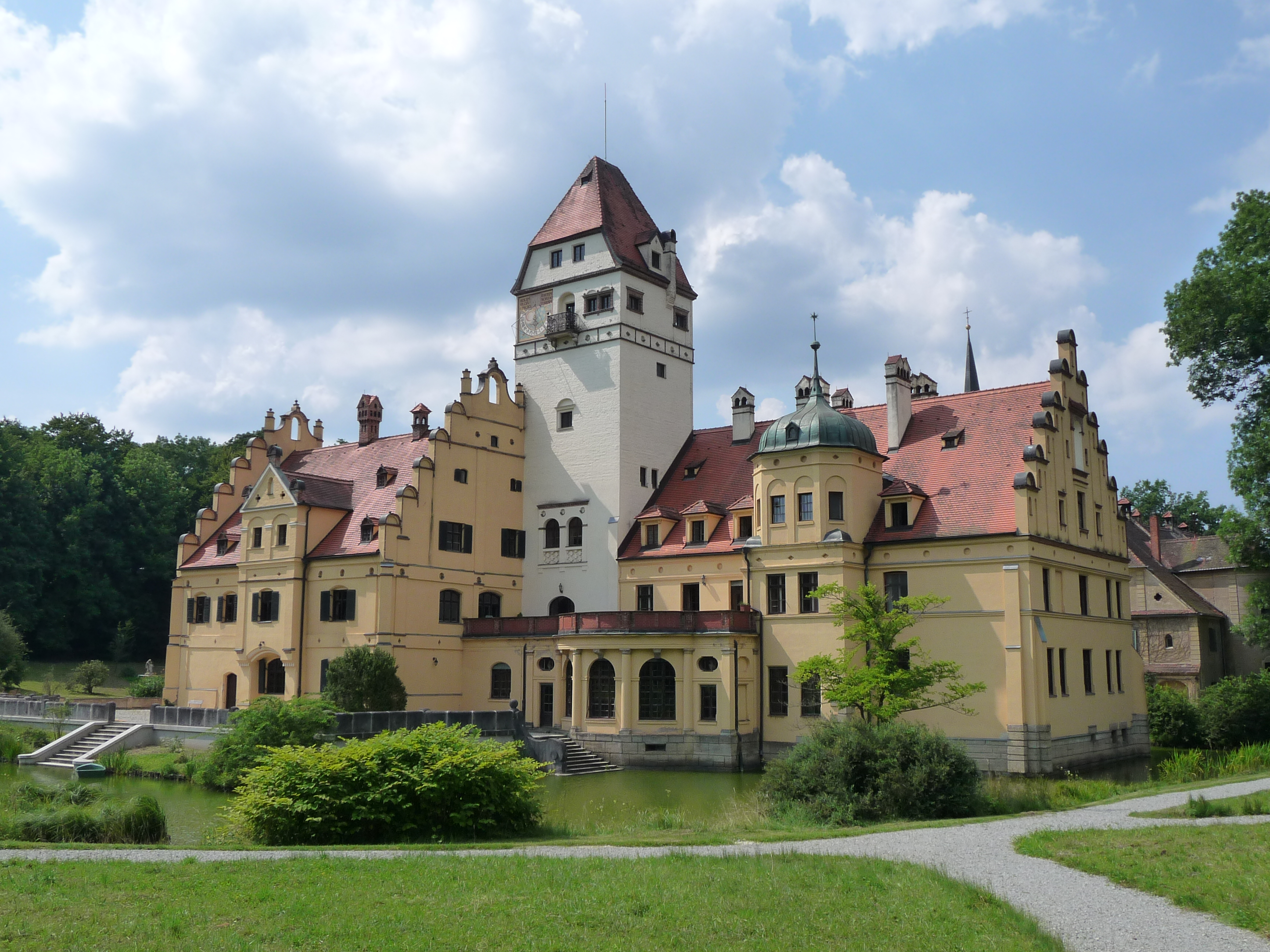
Schönau Water Castle, Schönau (Rottal), 1899–1900

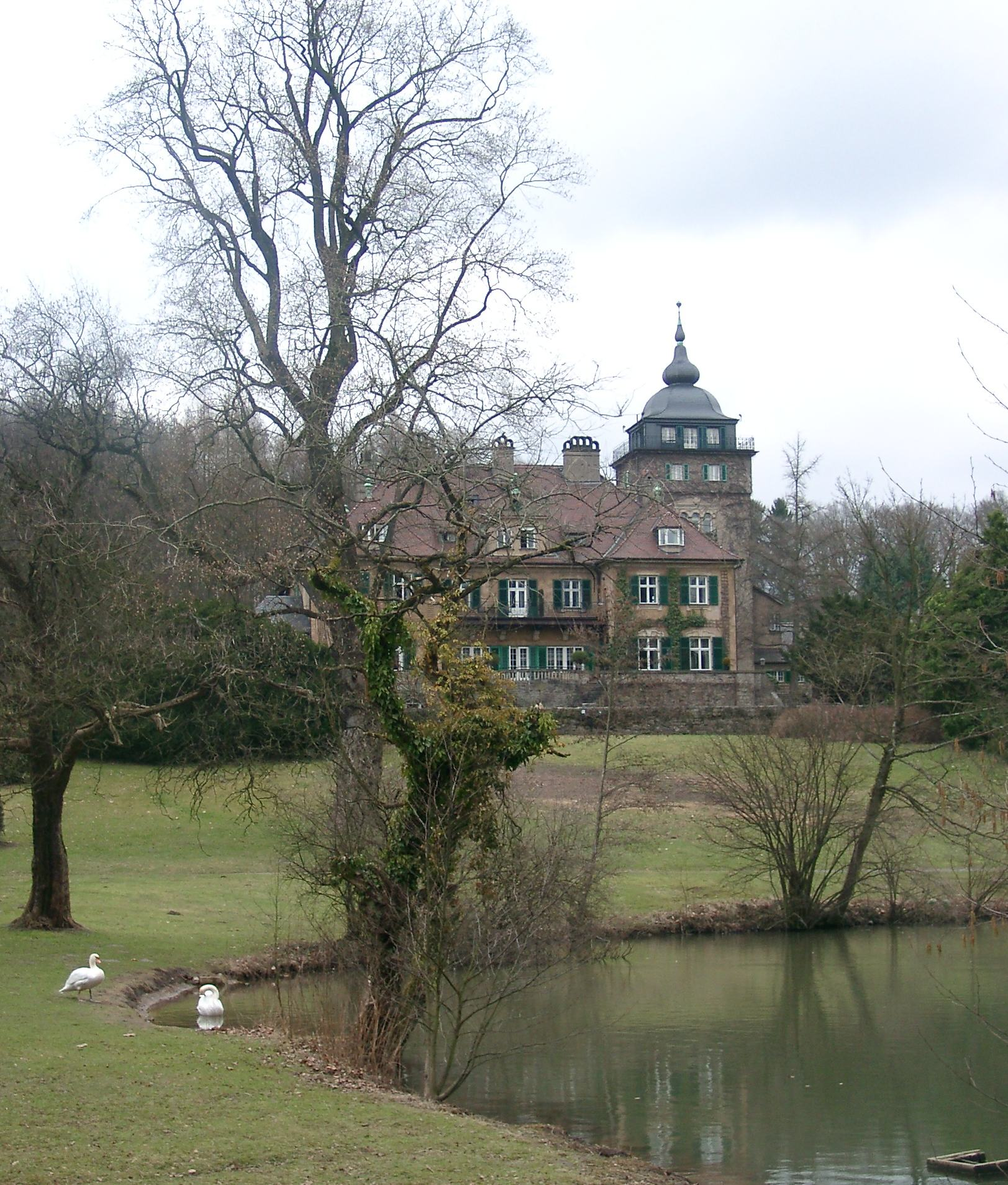
Lerbach Castle, Bergisch Gladbach, 1900

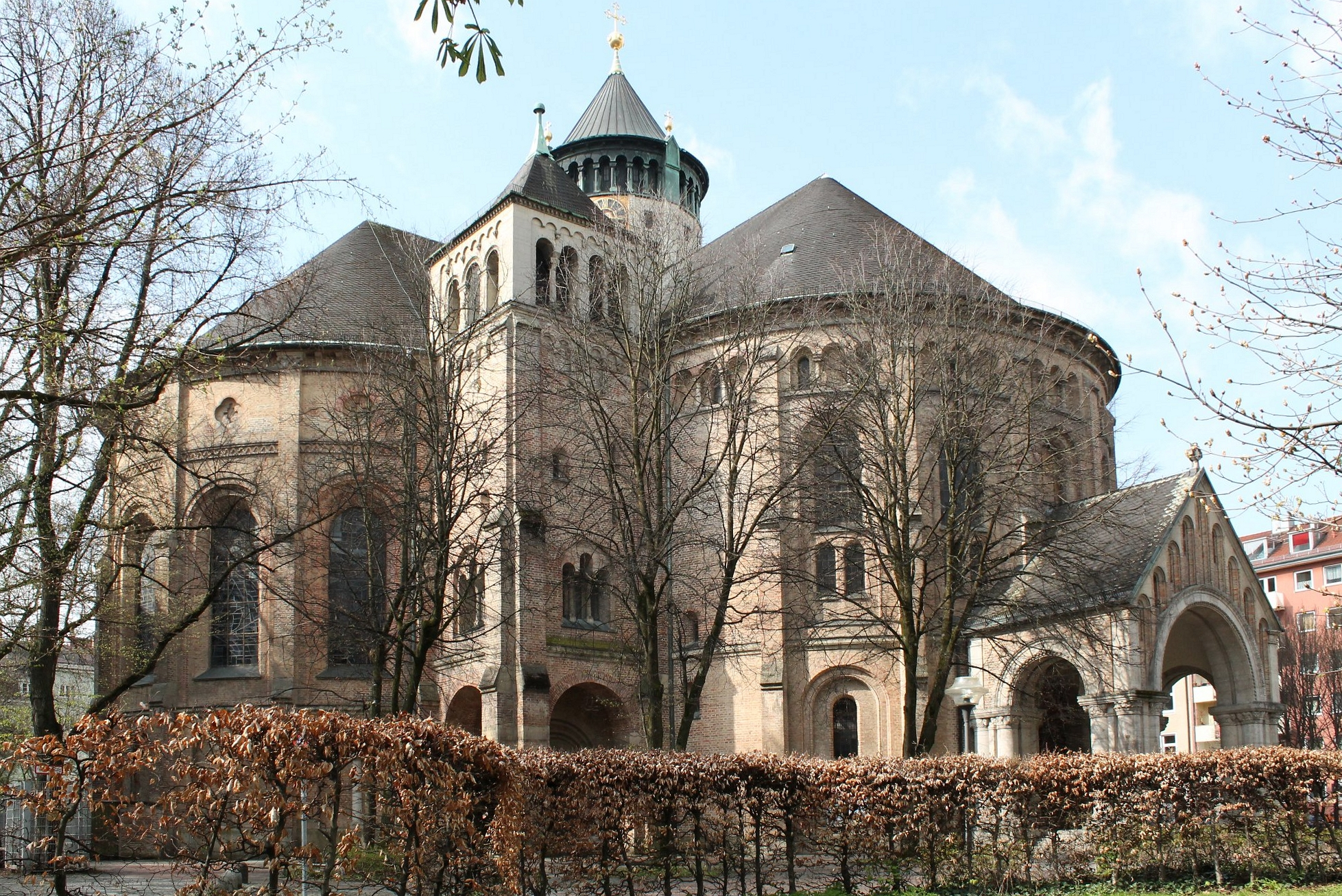
St. Rupert's Church, Munich, 1901–1903

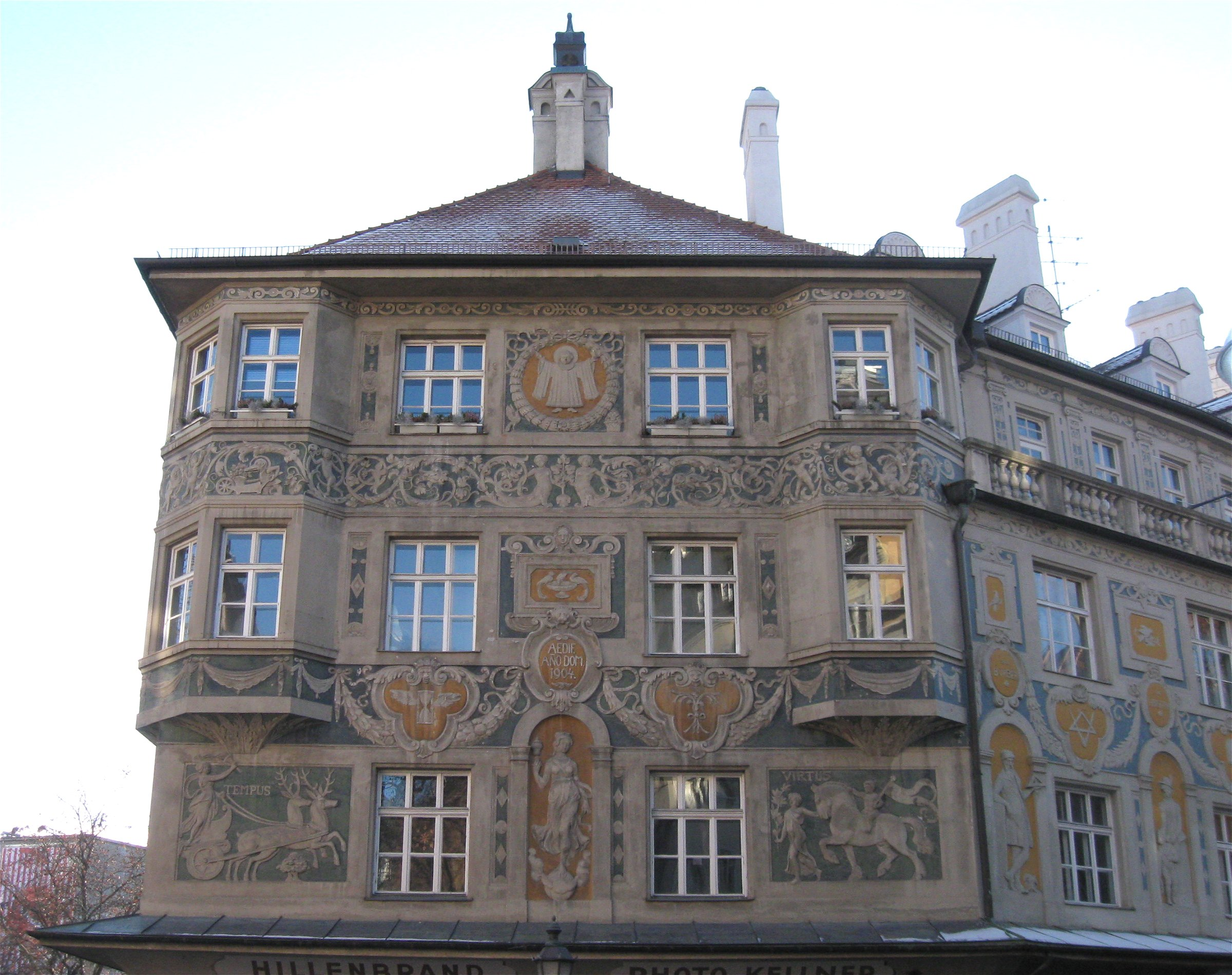
Ruffinihaus at Rindermarkt 10, Munich, 1903–1905

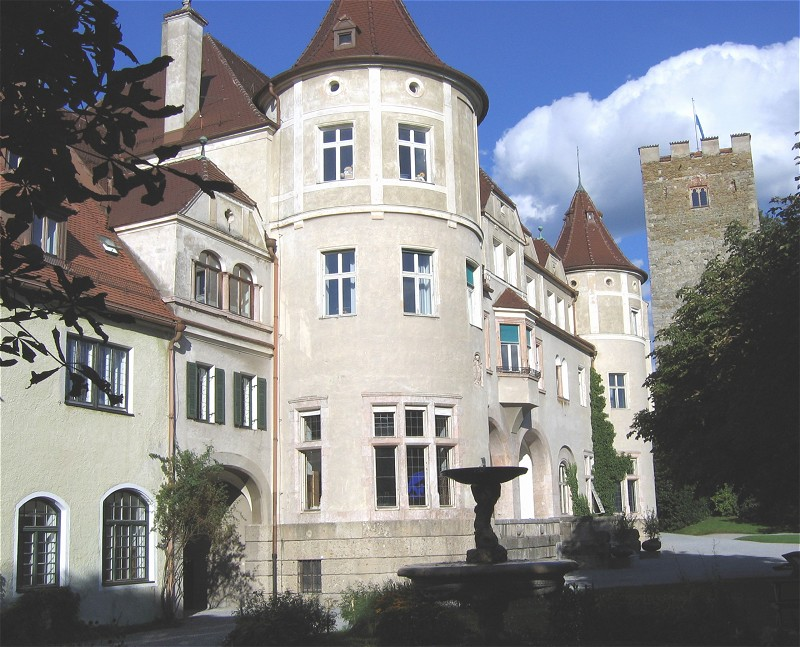
Neubeuern Castle, construction of the middle tract, 1904–1908

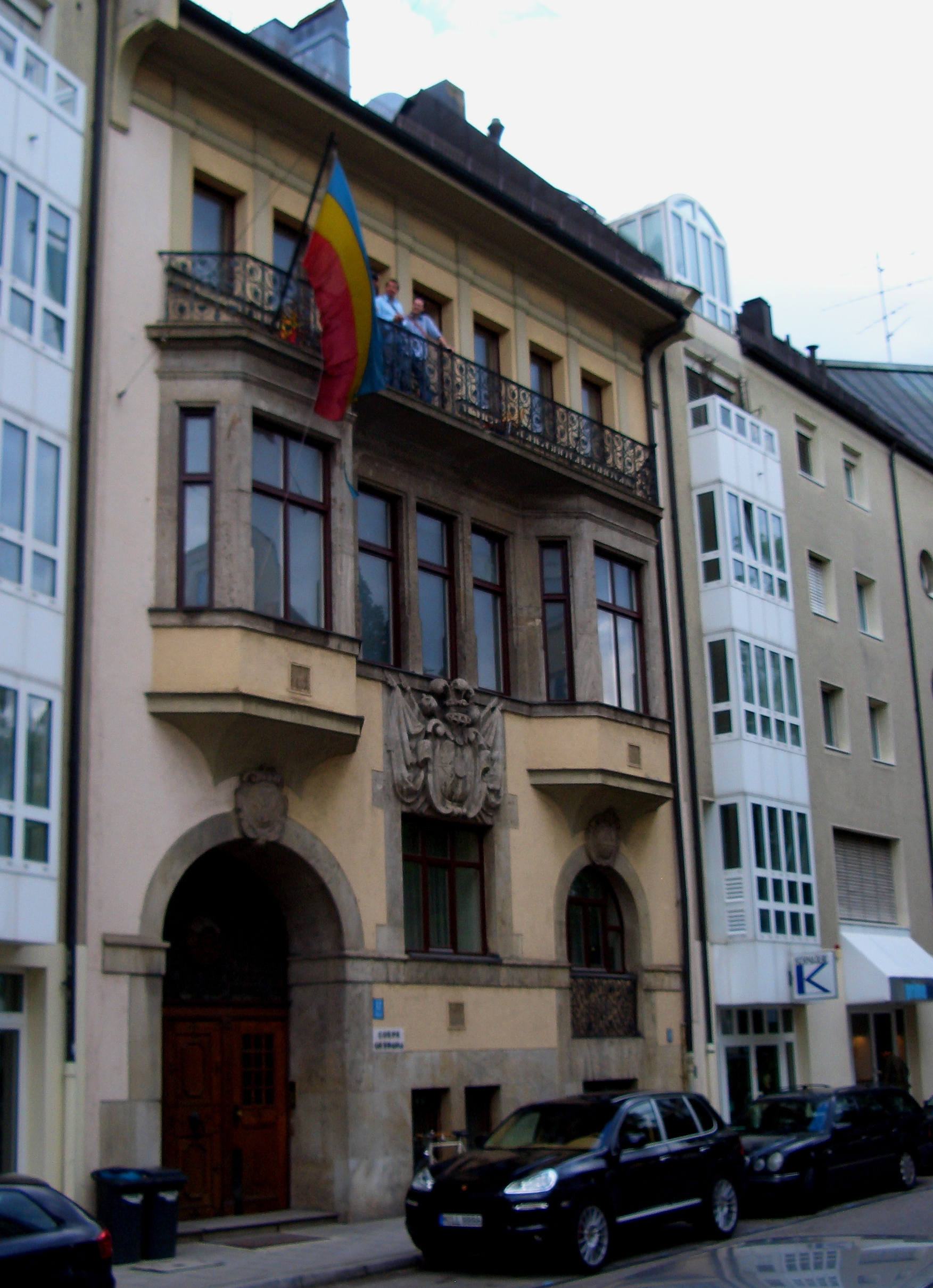
Corpshaus of the Corps Germania Munich

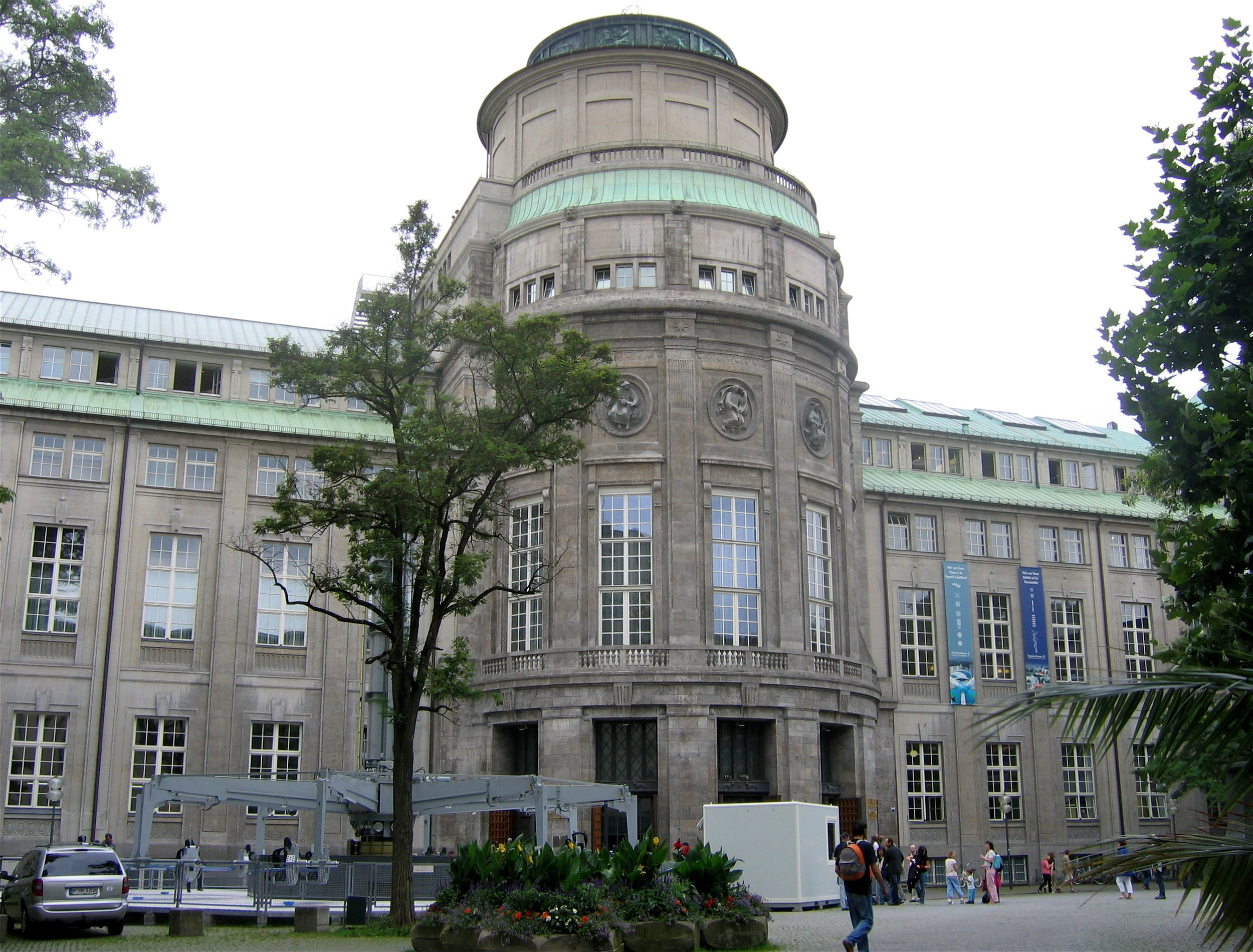
Deutsches Museum, Munich (begun in 1906; after Gabriel von Seidel's death in 1913 his brother Emanuel von Seidl continued the work until his own death in 1919; construction was completed in 1925)

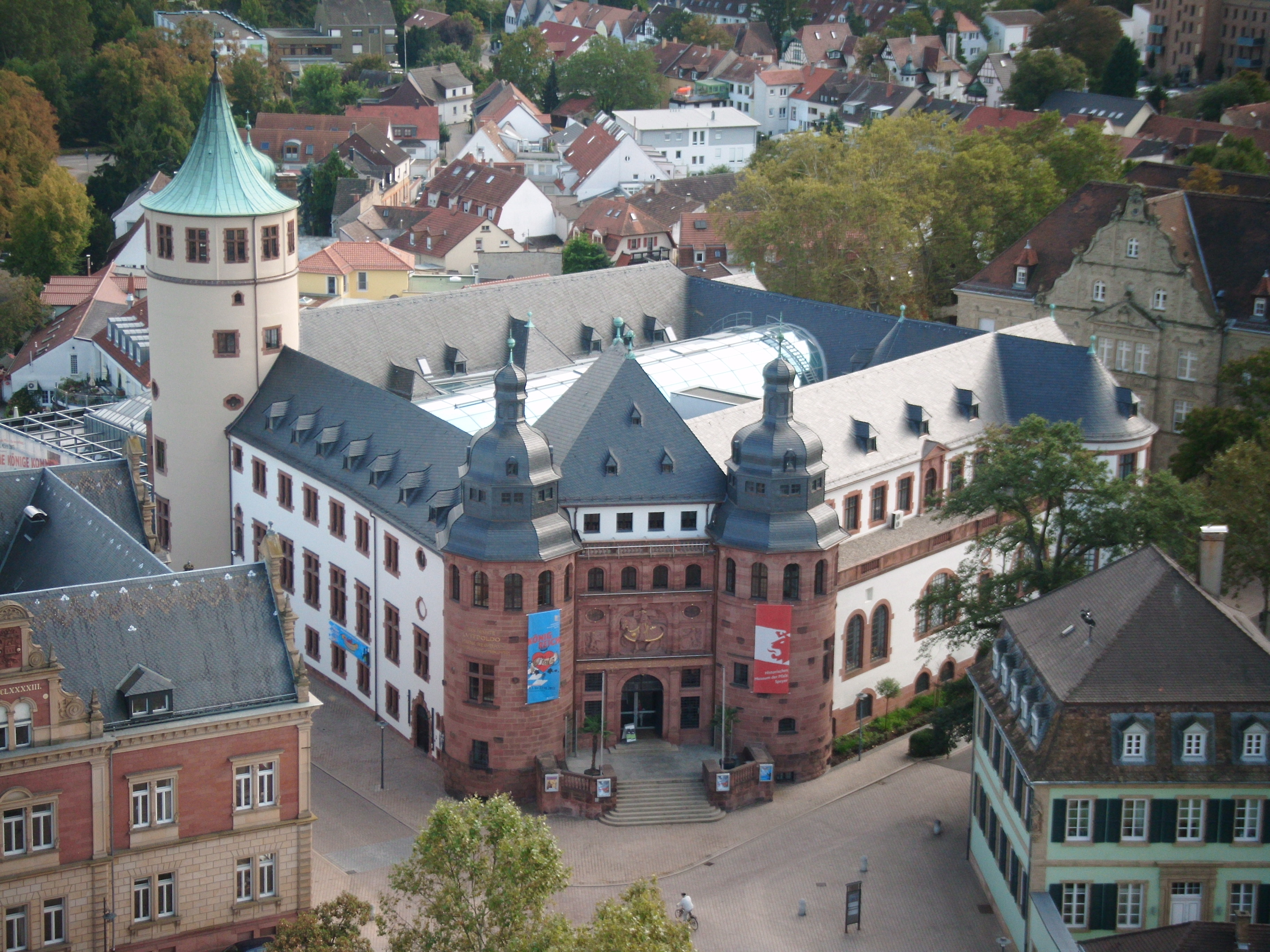
Historical Museum of the Palatinate, Speyer, 1907

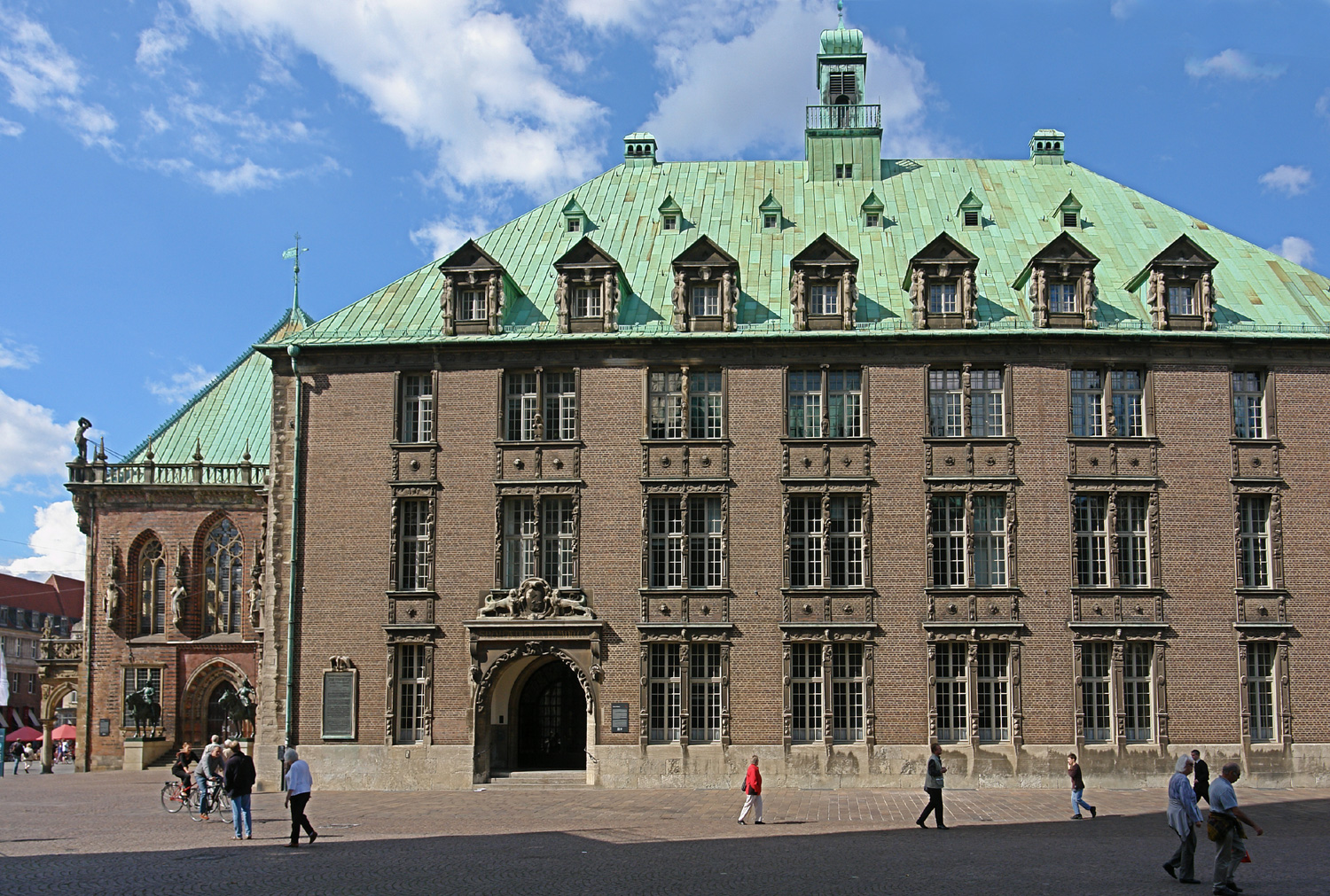
New Town Hall, Bremen, 1909–1913

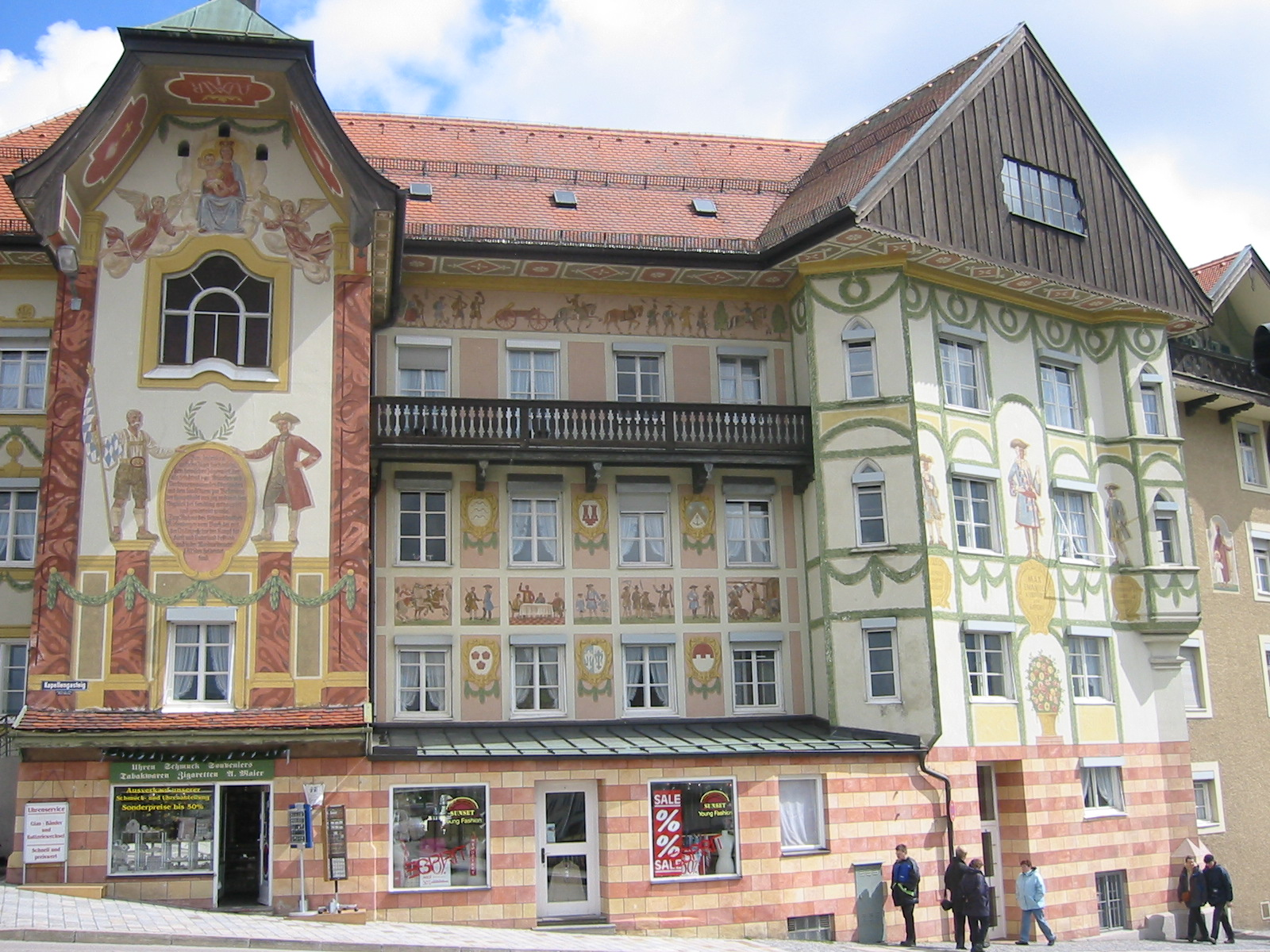
Redesign of Marienstift, Bad Tölz

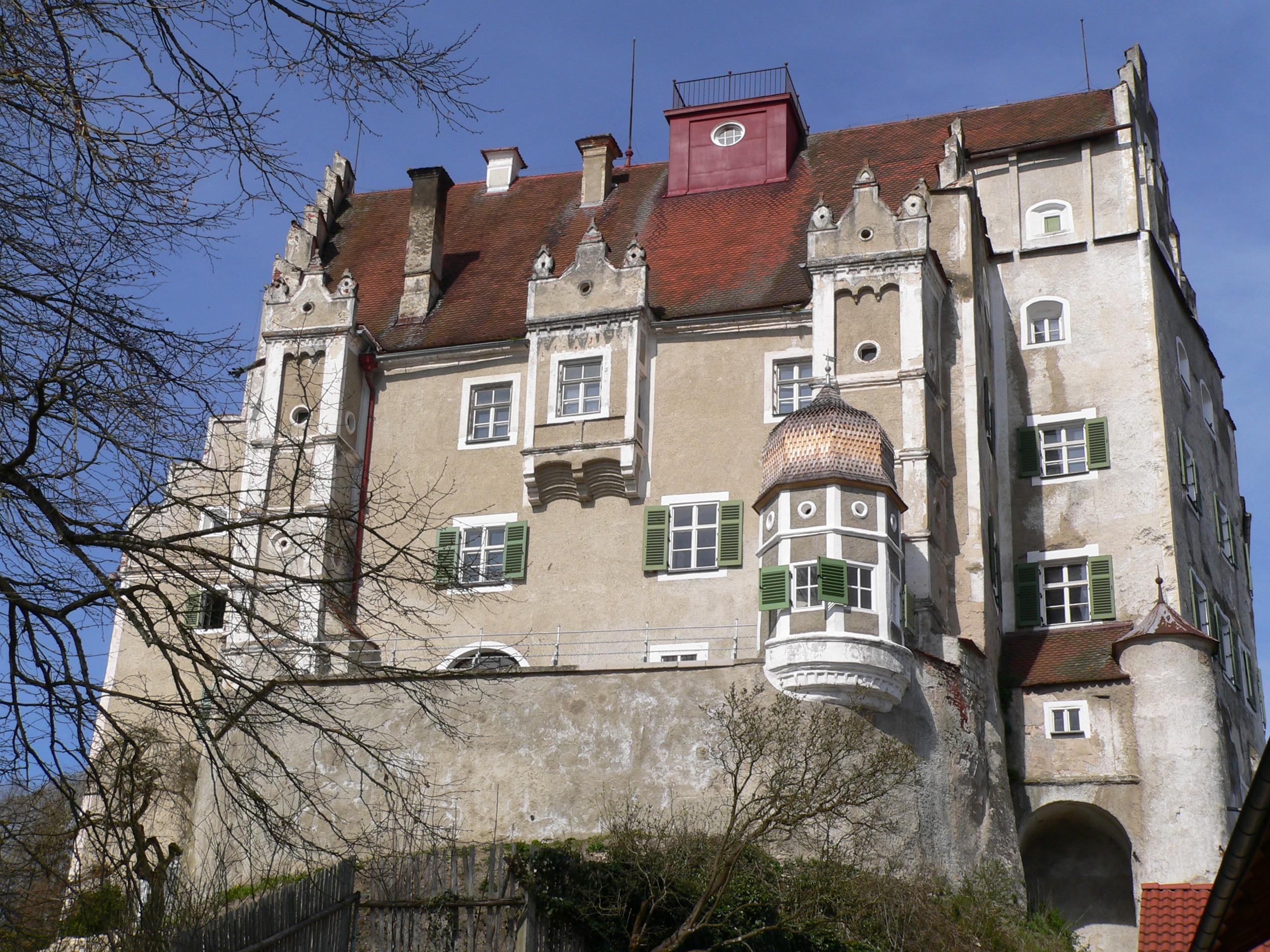
Schloss Sandersdorf, renovation, 1900

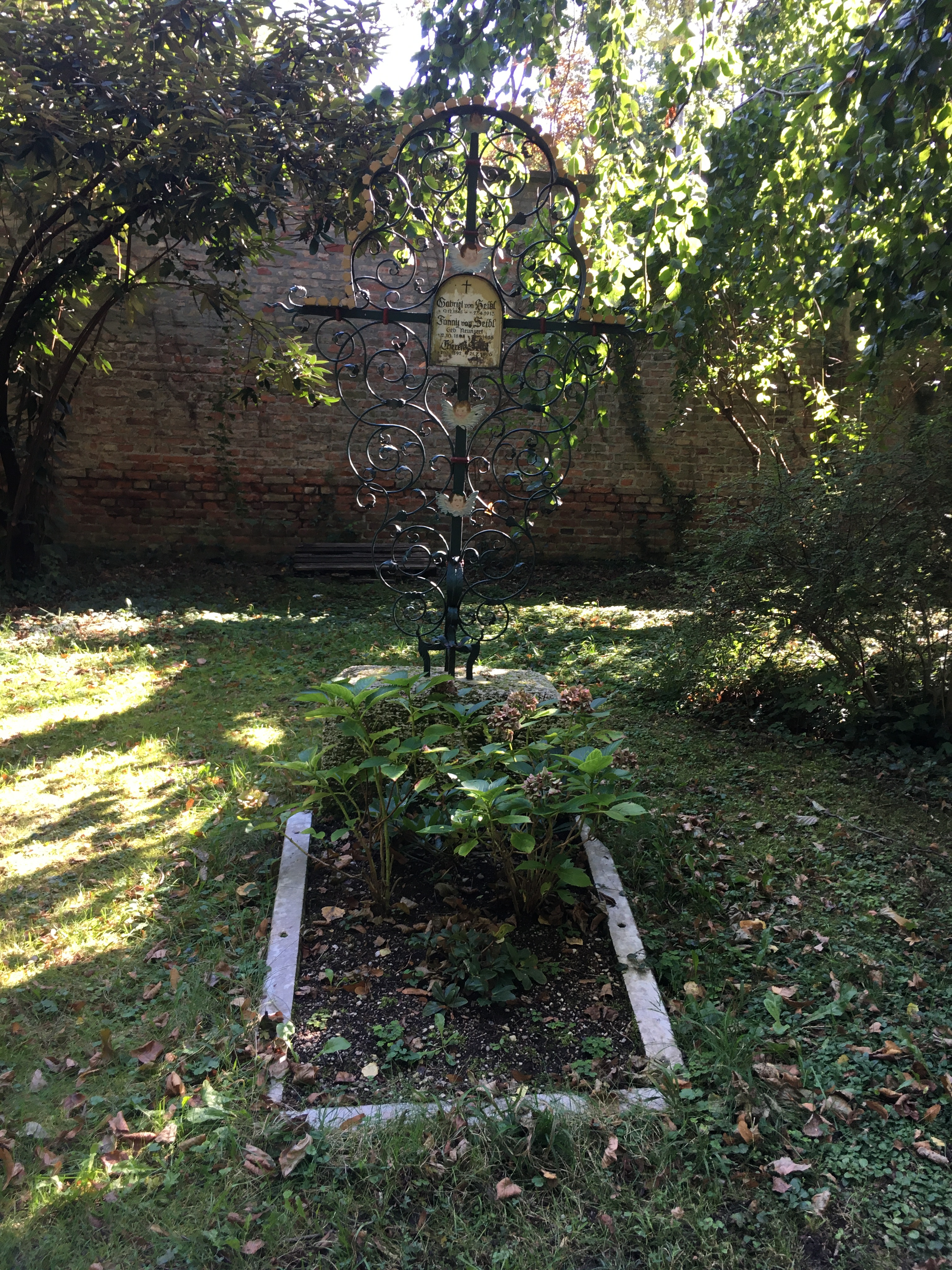
Grab auf dem Alten Südfriedhof München

== See also ==
- Jakob Heilmann
- List of architects
- List of German artists
