= Ruffinihaus =

Housing complex in Munich, Bavaria, Germany

Coordinates: 48°08′11″N 11°34′25″E

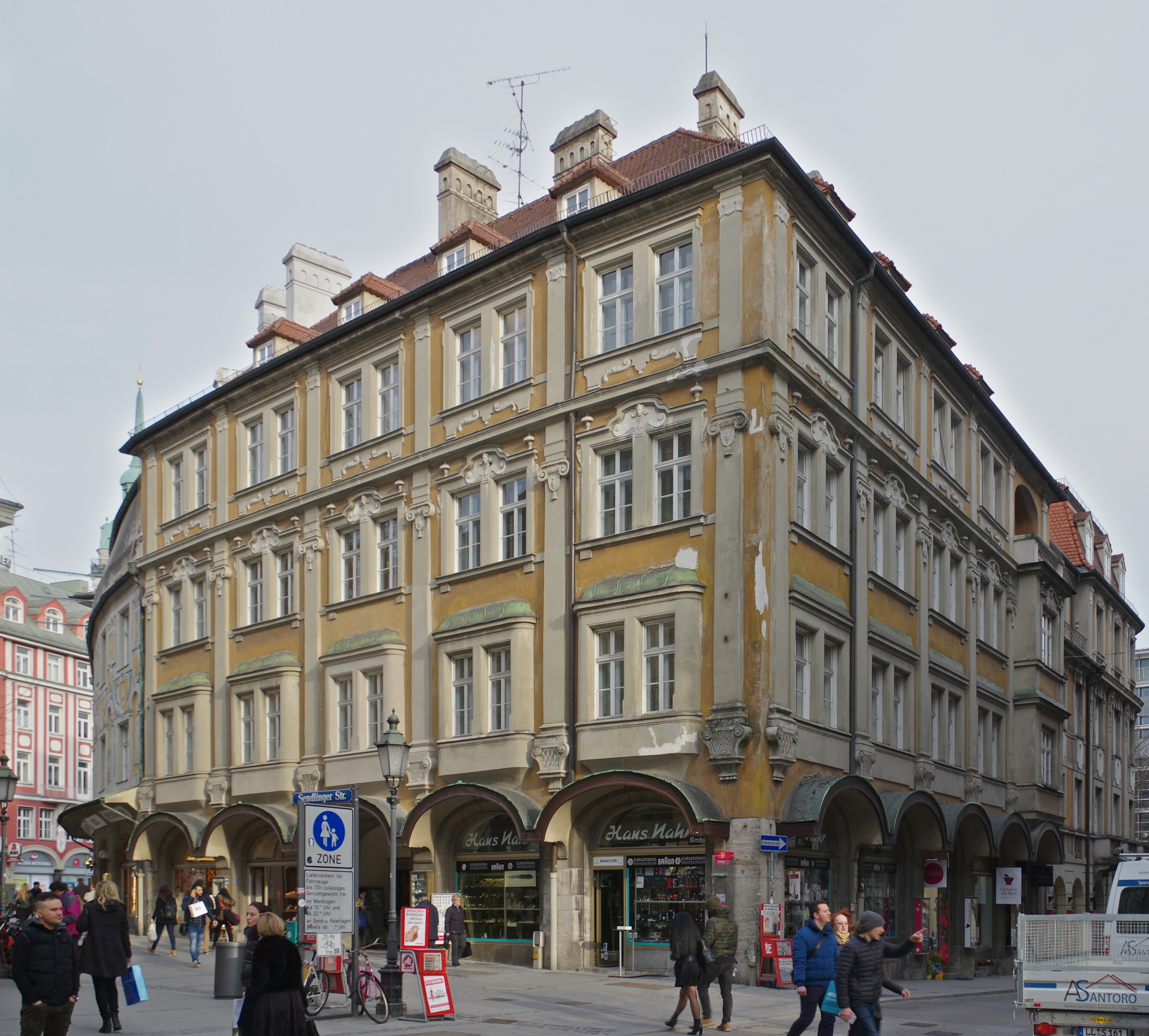
Ruffinihaus: West corner on Sendlinger and Pettenbeck Streets

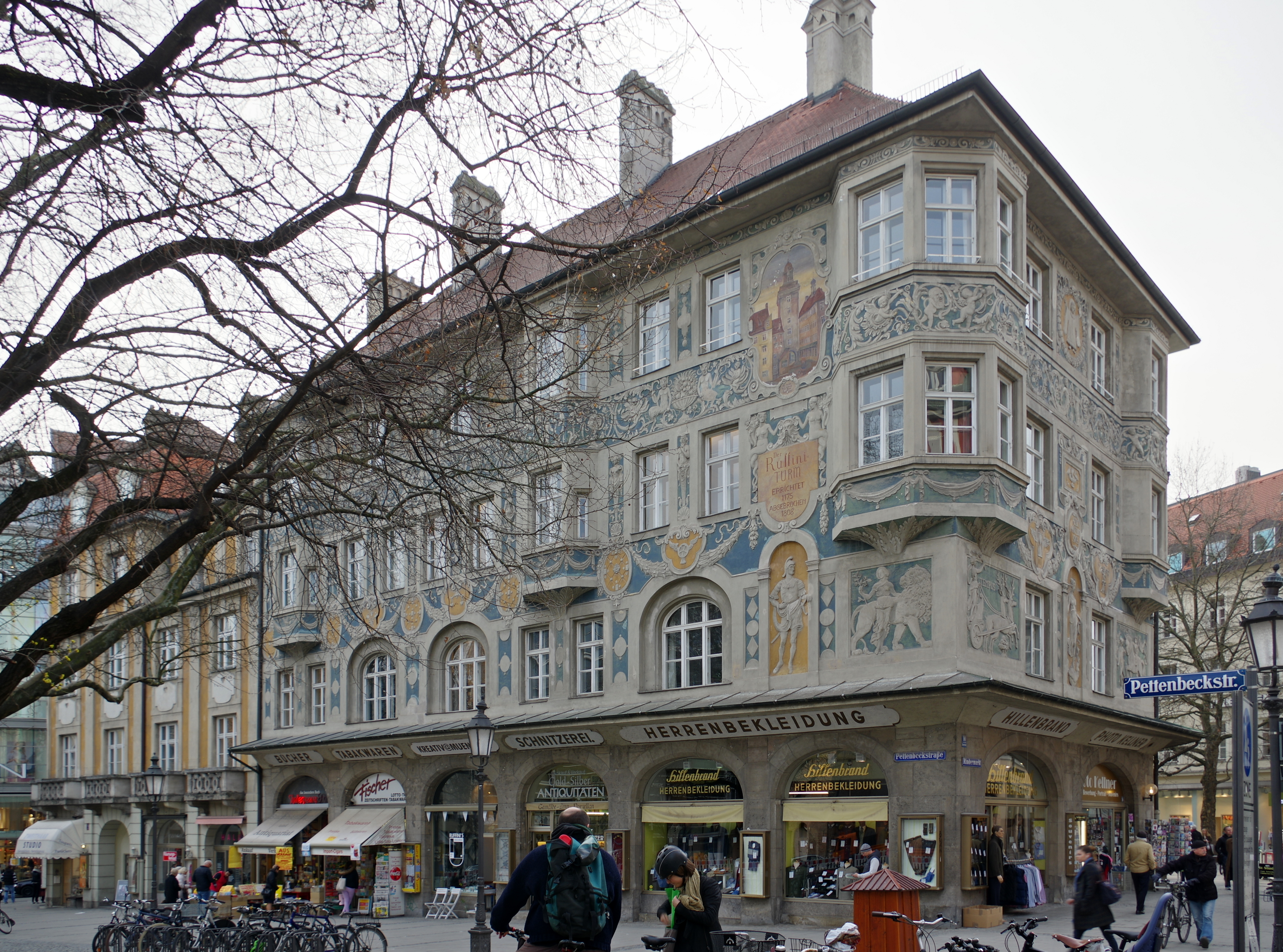
East corner facing the Rindermarkt, with the Ruffiniturm fresco

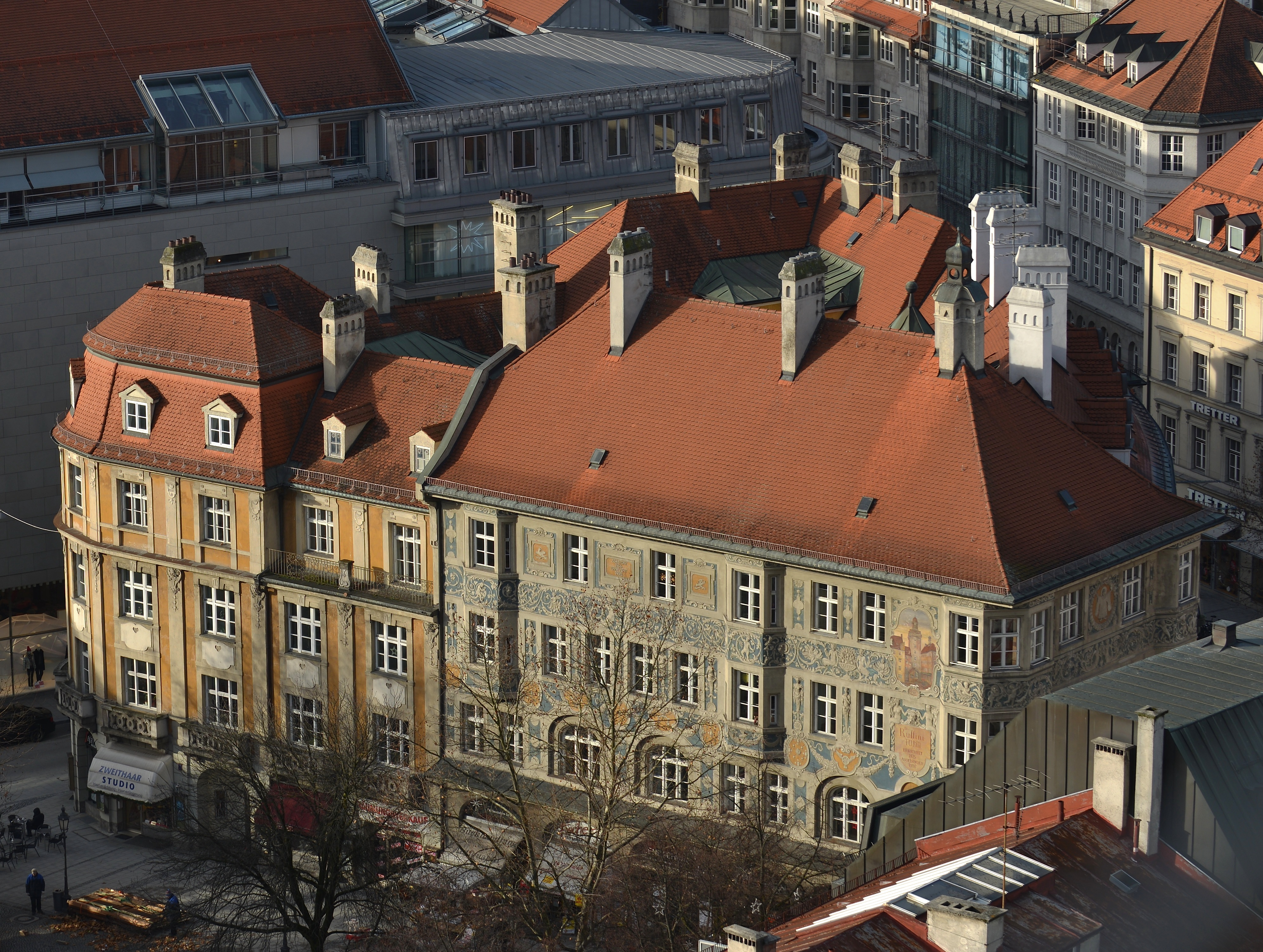
Roofscape of the Ruffinihaus. The connection between the southwest and northeast buildings is also clearly visible.

The Ruffinihaus (from German: "Ruffini House") is a group of three houses (also known as Ruffinihäuser) on the Rindermarkt ("cattle market") in the Old Town of Munich, Bavaria. It was built by Gabriel von Seidl from 1903 to 1905 and is named after the Ruffiniturm ("Ruffini tower", demolished in 1808), which in turn was named after Johann Baptista Ruffini. The Ruffiniturm formed the original Sendlinger Tor ("Sendlinger gate") and thus was part of Munich's first city wall.

The Ruffinihaus is a three-sided house that borders Sendlinger and Pettenbeck streets. The Ruffinihaus stands on what was the fluvial terrace of the first medieval fortification's moat, as can still be seen today when viewed from the southeast. This is a prominent site by virtue of both being a historical location and marking the transition point between the oldest core of the city and its first expansion in the 13th century.

The Bavarian Office of Monument Preservation describes the building as "romantic-native mood architecture of the highest level for the interpretation of a historicist image of an old town as seen under a picturesque ideal."

== History ==
In the late Middle Ages, the site of the current Ruffinihaus was divided into small sections. From 1708 to 1721 the land was acquired by two families, Püttrich and Ruffini. Around 1800 a single, unified, four-story building was built in the Baroque style. It housed a variety of small shops. As part of a new road extension, the city bought the property in 1898 and held an architectural design competition. Gabriel von Seidl prevailed against the design of a large department store, and suggested developing the block under the name Drei Häuser ("Three houses") while keeping the impression of smaller structures and the individual shops of the previous building.

== Structural details ==
The three individual houses with different character are grouped around a central, triangular courtyard. Noteworthy is the roofscape whose multiform design significantly contributes to the structuring of the building and gives rise to the impression of three independent buildings.

The main building faces north; its narrow side marks the end of Rose Street coming from the Marienplatz. On the west side, the facade follows the convex shape of the street layout of Sendlingerstraße; the east wing facing the Rindermarkt has a straight baseline. The top two floors of the main building have four bay windows with polygonal floor plans facing north and east; these are the only elements of the facade standing out. The top floor of the west facade steps back and opens onto a terrace behind a small balustrade. Above the limestone facade of the shop floor, a full-length copper-roofed canopy juts out. A groove under the canopy leaves room for shop signs. The eaves of the main block stand out prominently and borrow from Alpine architecture. The facade of the upper floors is richly decorated with stucco and bas-relief, which were designed by Julius Seidler and Philipp Widmer. These depict allegories of virtues and occupations, as well as symbols for professions and ranks surrounded by cartouches and connected by festoons. The style of the motifs draws on rural construction forms from the foothills of the Alps and mixes them with aspects of old Munich town houses. A fresco by Karl Wahler, depicting the historical Ruffiniturm, is integrated on the east facade. In this building the entrance hall has groin vaults; the only other interior design elements still preserved from the original building are the spiral staircase, its wrought-iron railing, and some former apartment doors.

The house in the southwest corner is built in the late Baroque style. The storefront facade is divided by round-arched canopies which look like arcades. On the south side, a bay window with a loggia stands at its border with the neighboring building. The facades of the first and second floors are divided by pilasters with capitals and rich consoles, flanking a pair of windows on either side. The pilasters continue to the third floor above a circumferential belt cornice. The corner building originally had two Dutch gables which were not rebuilt after the Second World War.

The building in the southeast corner is the smallest part of the building complex. The corner itself is clearly emphasized. The ground floor is rounded, the first floor is accented by massive protruding stone balconies, and the second by a cornice. The third floor is set back where it borders the neighboring buildings; thus the corner gives a vivid and powerful impression. The steep mansard roof also contributes to this striking appearance.

== Rebuild and refurbishment ==
The Ruffinihaus was damaged in 1944 during World War II. It was initially secured only provisionally and rebuilt between 1954 and 1955 by Erwin Schleich with a few changes. In 1973 Schleich initiated further renovation of the building.

In 2008 and 2009, further work was carried out. The former apartments on the upper floors now house city administration offices, including the Tourism Office of the city of Munich. The ground floor is occupied by traditional Munich shops.
