= Josef Henselmann =

German sculptor and professor

Josef Henselmann (16 August 1898 in Sigmaringen – 19 January 1987) was a German sculptor and professor.

Henselmann was born in Sigmaringen, Province of Hohenzollern. After studying at the Gymnasium he completed an apprenticeship to be a wood sculptor. After the First World War he was a student at the Munich Academy. He taught at the Münchner Staatsschule für angewandte Kunst (Munich School for applied arts) and from 1946 was a professor at the Munich Academy, where he served an extensive period of time as Academy President. Henselmann died in Munich.

He was married to the painter Marianne Henselmann, née Euler (born 1903 in Aschaffenburg; died 2002 in Munich), with whom he had two children.

== Selection of works ==
- High Altar in the St. Stephan's Cathedral in Passau
- Chorbogencruzifix in the Munich Frauenkirche
- Rindermarktbrunnen in Munich
- Vierjahreszeitenbrunnen in Sigmaringen
- Christophorus in der Prinzregentenstraße in Munich
- Trumpeter of Säckingen

as well as numerous other works in the Bavarian and Upper Swabian region.

- Hygieia in the foyer of Jodquellen AG in Bad Tölz

== Selection of awards ==
- Großer Preussischer Staatspreis (Grand Prussian State Prize)
- Bayerischer Verdienstorden (Bavarian Order of Merit)
- Bayerischer Maximiliansorden für Wissenschaft und Kunst (Bavarian Maximilian Order for Science and Art)
- Förderpreis im Bereich Bildende Kunst der Landeshauptstadt München (Translates as "Munich Fellowship of the Fine Arts") (1957)
