= Aloys Basselet von La Rosée =

Bavarian judge (1747–1826)

Johann Kaspar Aloys Reichsgraf Basselet von La Rosée (5 May 1747 Munich - 5 December 1826) was a Bavarian official and judge as well as a member of the Illuminati.

He was a son of Lieutenant Field Marshal Johann Kaspar Basselet von La Rosée and grandson of the Bavarian State Chancellor Franz Xaver Josef von Unertl.

Aloys was a jurist and became an electoral Bavarian chamberlain and court councilor. Later he was appointed president of the High Court of Appellation in Munich. In 1772, he became an honorary member of the Bavarian Academy of Sciences and Humanities. He owned the villages of Feldafing including Rose Island, Possenhofen and Pöcking near Lake Starnberg.
