= Rindermarkt =

Street in Munich, Germany

Coordinates: 48°08′11″N 11°34′29″E

The Rindermarkt is one of the oldest streets in Munich, which connects to the Marienplatz in the north through the former Inner Sendlinger Tor. Its continuation today forms the Sendlinger Straße, which leads to the (outer) Sendlinger Tor.

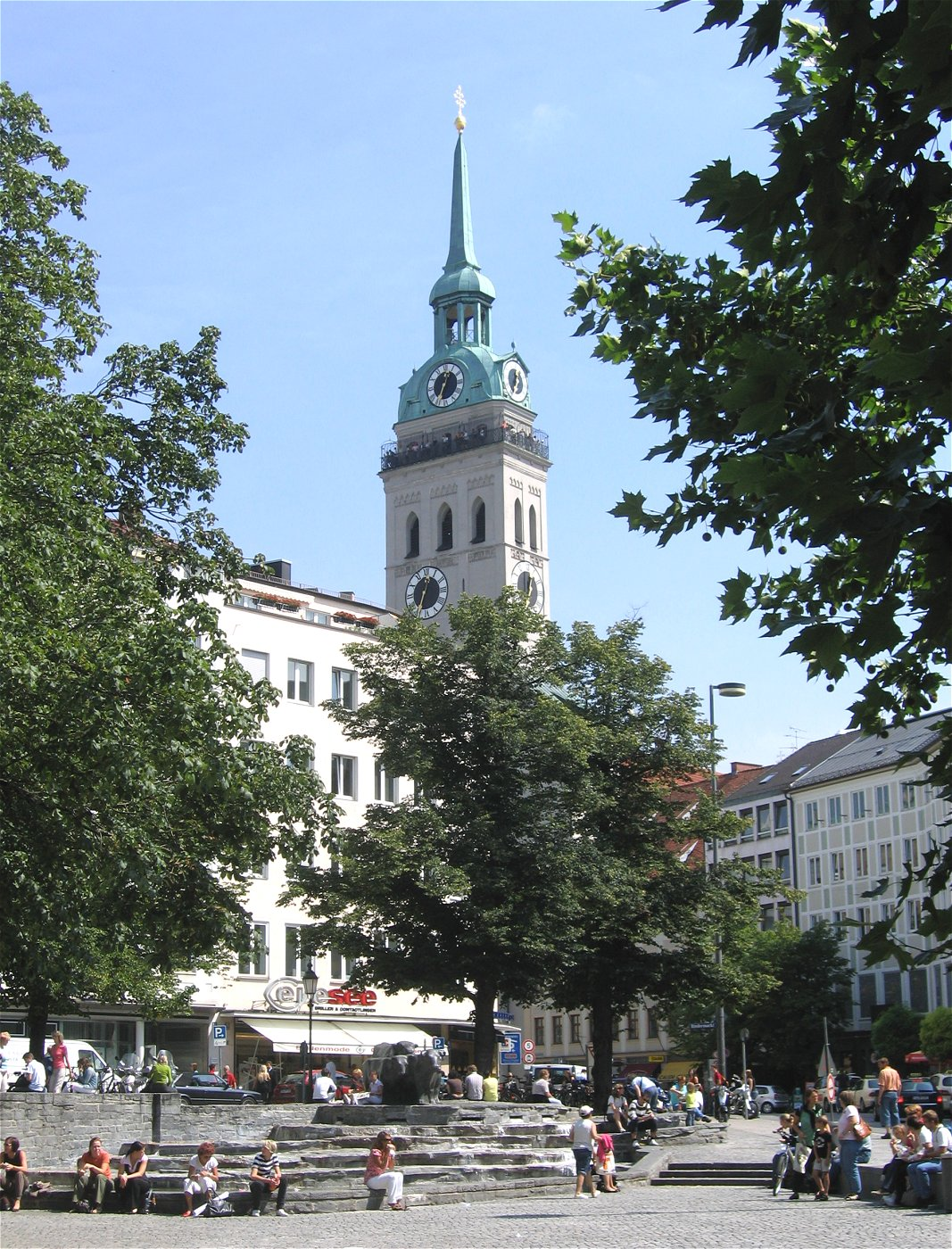
Rindermarkt, in the background the church Sankt Peter

Originally, this street was used as a cattle marketplace, from which the name of the street derives. Later, noble patricians built their homes here. During the Second World War, the houses on Rindermarkt were badly affected. During the reconstruction, the original roads were extended in the direction of Oberanger to today's place. Only the north side of today's Rindermarkt still follows the old street routes. Today, the Munich Rindermarkt acts as a haven in the midst of the old town of Munich. Many traditional companies and retail shops have settled there. During the Advent time, the Kripperlmarkt took place there until 2011 as part of the traditional Christmas markets.

== Buildings on Rindermarkt ==
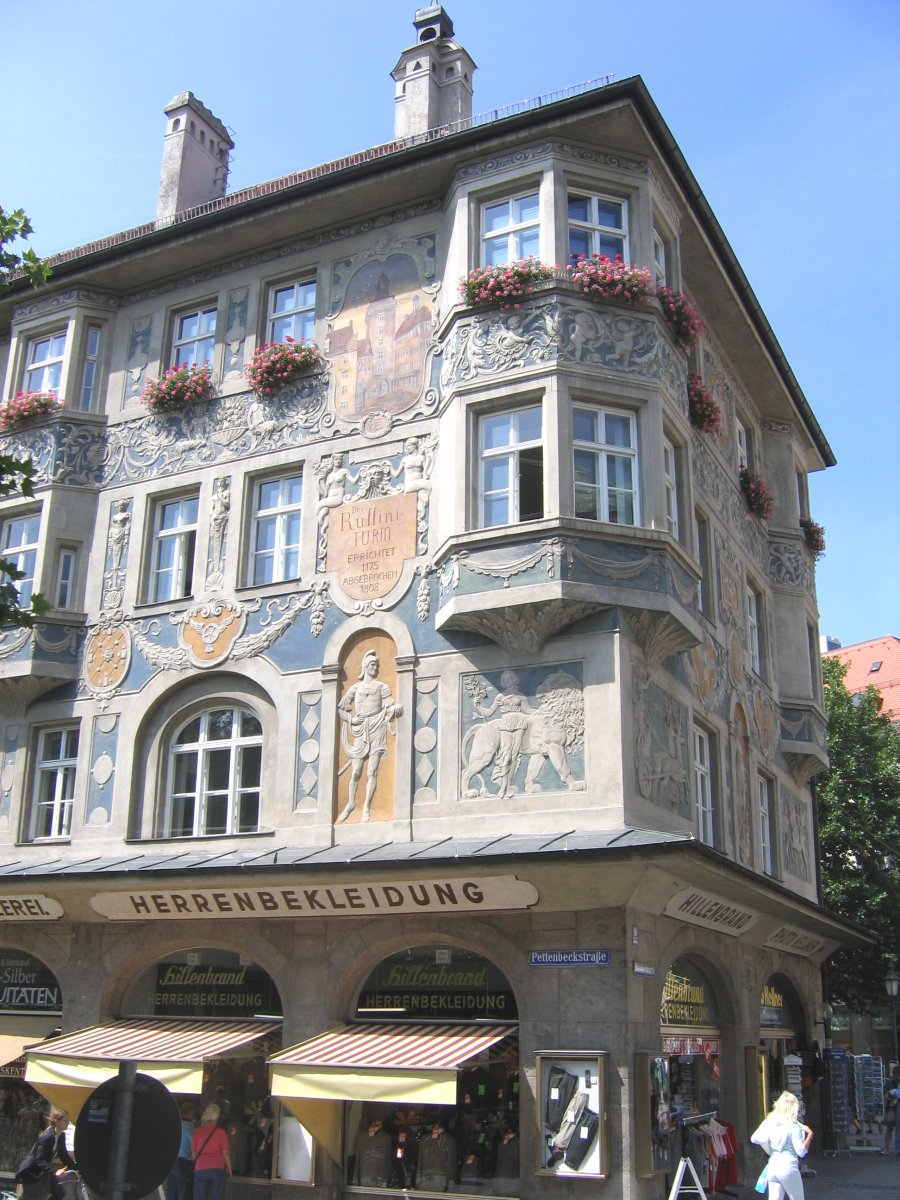
Ruffinihaus at the Rindermarkt with Ruffiniturm fresco

- The church of St. Peter, Munich's oldest parish church, whose tower is colloquially called "Alter Peter", bears the number Rindermarkt 1 and marks the northern end of Rindermarkt towards Marienplatz.
- The Rindermarkt fountain represents a sitting shepherd watching over three cattle.
- The Lion Tower on the southeastern side of Rindermarkt is a 15th-century water tower, with frescoes of birds, trees and characters.
- The Ruffinihaus from 1905, is actually a group of three houses at Rindermarkt 10, which are particularly richly decorated. A fresco on the facade shows the Ruffiniturm (former Inner Sendlinger Tor), which stood nearby at the end of Rosenstraße.
