= Rindermarktbrunnen =

Modern sculpture in Munich, Germany

Coordinates: 48°08′10″N 11°34′27″E

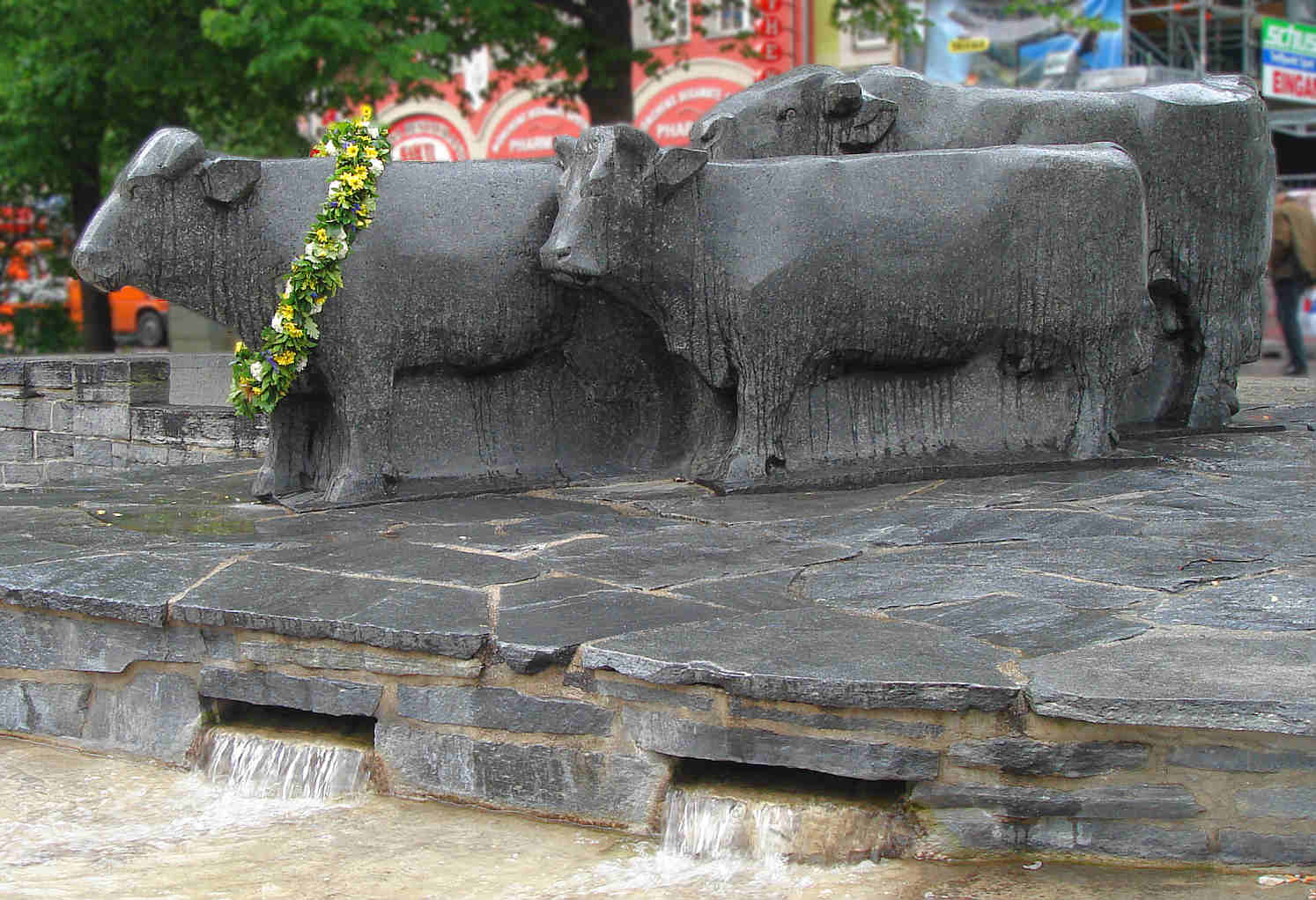
Rindermarktbrunnen

The Rindermarktbrunnen or literally "Cattle market fountain" in English is a modern sculpture in the historical Altstadt of Munich, in Bavaria, Germany. It was created in 1964 by Munich sculptor and professor of the Munich Academy Josef Henselmann in the course of the reorganisation of the cattle market. The fountain was sponsored by Gunther Henle.

With his designs Henselmann observed the historical function of the square as an area of cattle trade and as an area for the cattle there to drink, which existed until into the 19th century. Out of Gneiss he created a terraced fountain scene on the lightly sloping site. The irregularly formed basin of the fountain in the centre of the work imitates the idea of a naturally formed puddle or pool.

The fountain is crowned by a powerful set of bronzeworks above the steps. It shows three cattle which look down from their position onto people resting at the base of the fountain. Slightly aside is the stone figure of an observing herdsman sitting on a retaining wall.
