= Franz Xaver Josef von Unertl =

Bavarian statesman

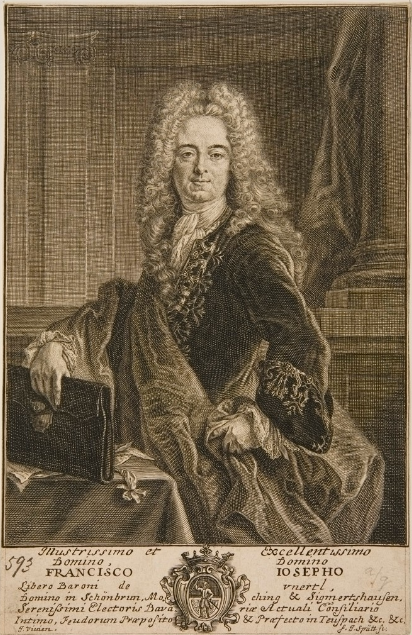
Franz Xaver Josef von Unertl

Franz Xaver Josef Baron von Unertl (21 February 1675 – 22 January 1750) was a Bavarian politician.

Unertl was born in Munich. He served as Electoral Bavarian Privy Council Chancellor and Conference Minister. His role under the Austrian occupation during the Spanish Succession War remains dubious. He died in his home town of Munich.

His sister Maria Johanna was married to the important salt merchant Johann Baptista Ruffini.
