= Karlsplatz (Stachus) =

Square in Munich, Germany

Coordinates: 48°08′21″N 11°33′57″E

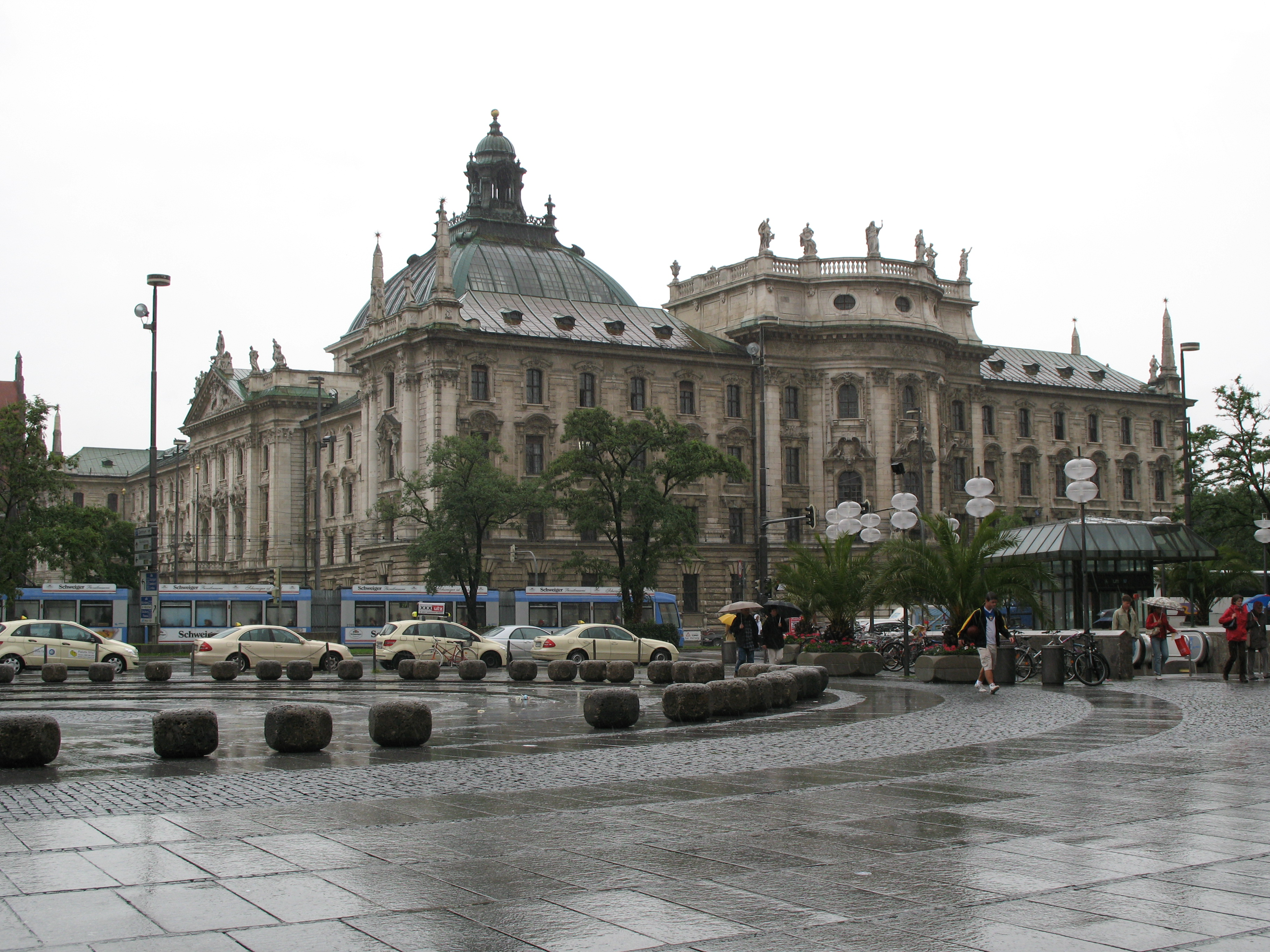
Justizpalast (Palace of Justice)

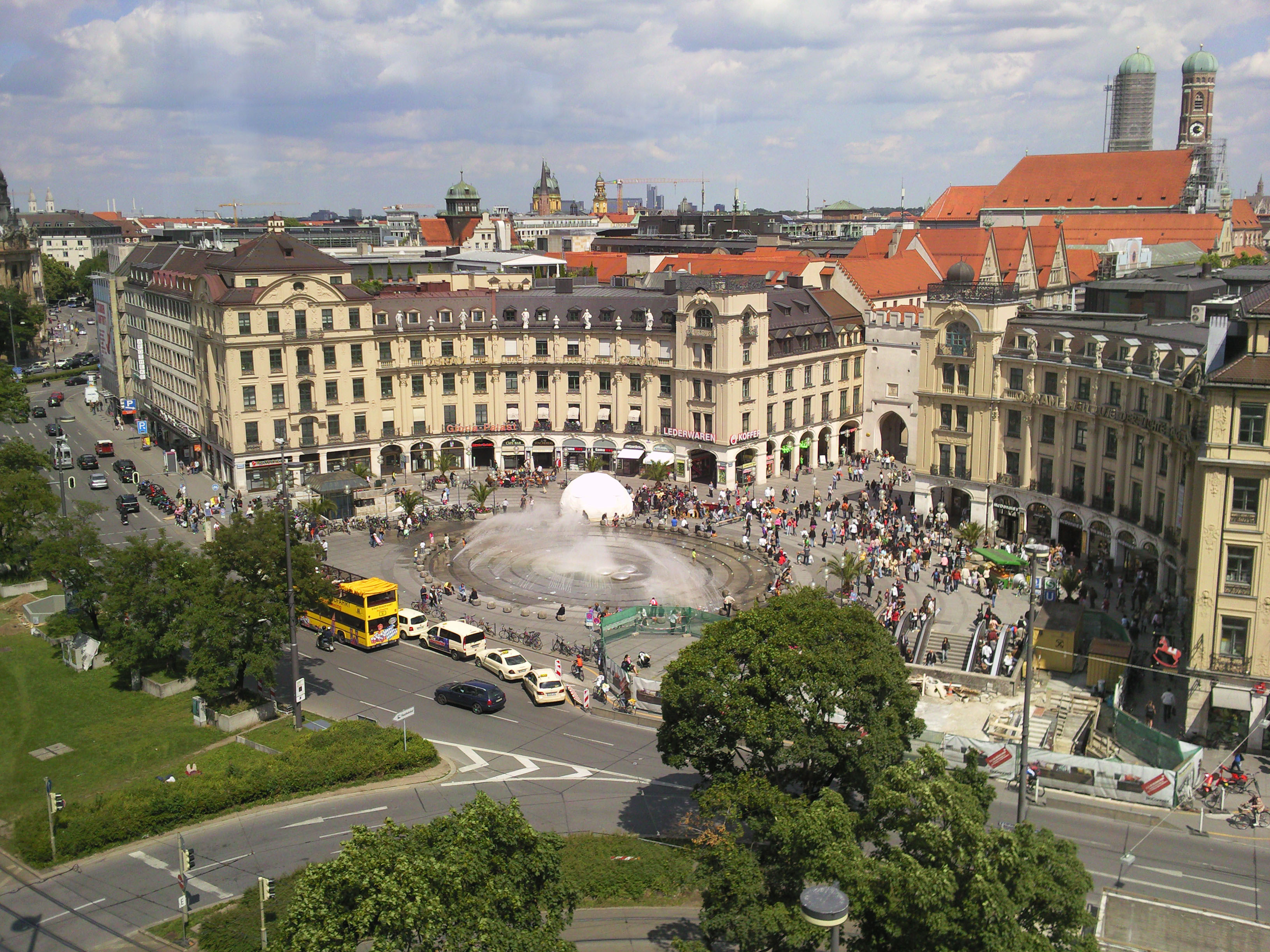
Stachus (east side)

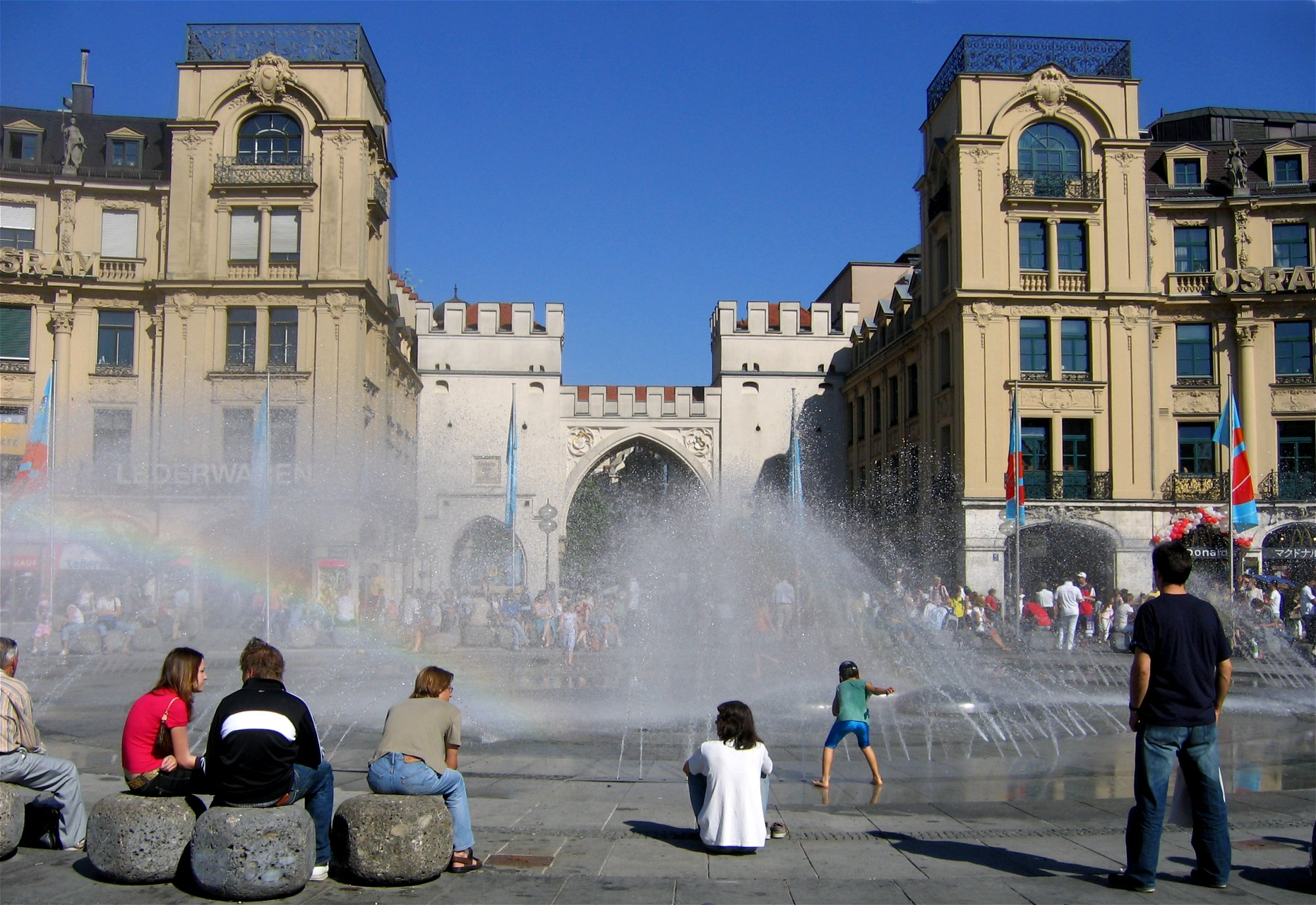
Karlstor

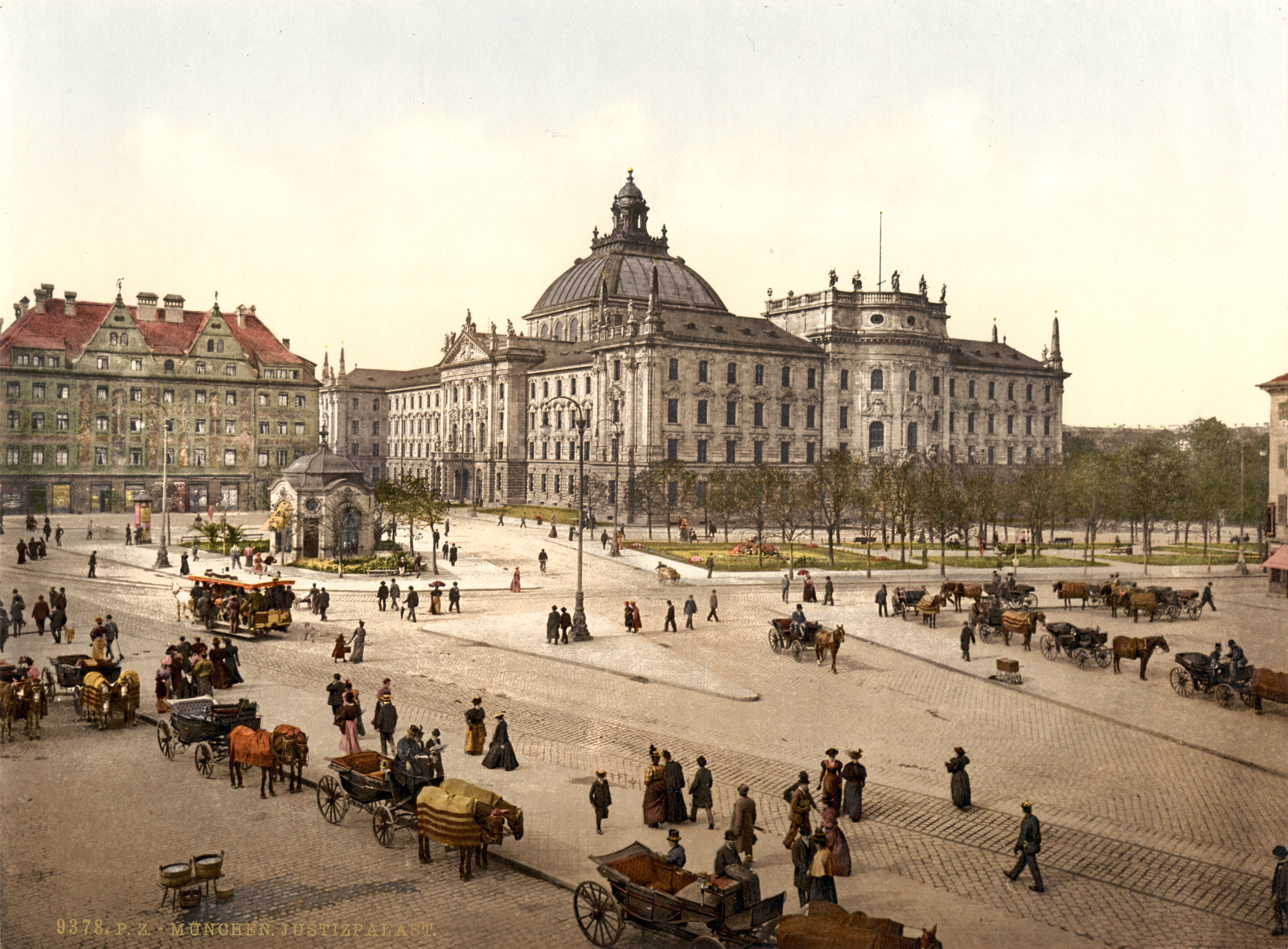
Munich Justizpalast 19th century Postcard

Stachus (German pronunciation: [ˈʃtaxʊs]) is a large square in central Munich, Bavaria. The square was officially named Karlsplatz in 1797 after the unpopular Charles Theodore, Elector of Bavaria. Munich natives rarely use that name, calling the square Stachus instead, after the pub Beim Stachus, once owned by Eustachius Föderl, which was located there until construction work for Karlsplatz began. Even the U-Bahn and S-Bahn announcements use the unofficial name.

== Architecture ==
The most important buildings dominating the square are located on the east side of the Karlstor, a gothic gate of the demolished medieval fortifications together with the rondell buildings on both sides of the gate (constructed by Gabriel von Seidl 1899-1902). The gate was first documented in 1301 and called Neuhauser Tor until 1791 when it was renamed Karlstor in honor of Charles Theodore, Elector of Bavaria. During the summer, a large fountain operates in front of the Karlstor and in winter an open-air ice rink is installed there. The most significant buildings on the opposite west side are the neo-baroque Justizpalast (Palace of Justice) and the Kaufhof, the first postwar department store built in Munich (by Theo Pabst, 1950-1951). A new building is planned for the Hotel Königshof.

The underground contains a large shopping center. Between Stachus square and Marienplatz, the main pedestrian area of the city, (Neuhauser Straße / Kaufingerstraße) houses many shops and restaurants.

The Karlsplatz (Stachus) U-Bahn and S-Bahn station is located below the square. Stachus also serves as a hub for the city's tramway system, with a four track tram station located on Altstadtring, the Old Town's orbital road system.
