= Hotel Königshof =

Hotel in Munich, Germany

Coordinates: 48.1396°N 11.5645°E

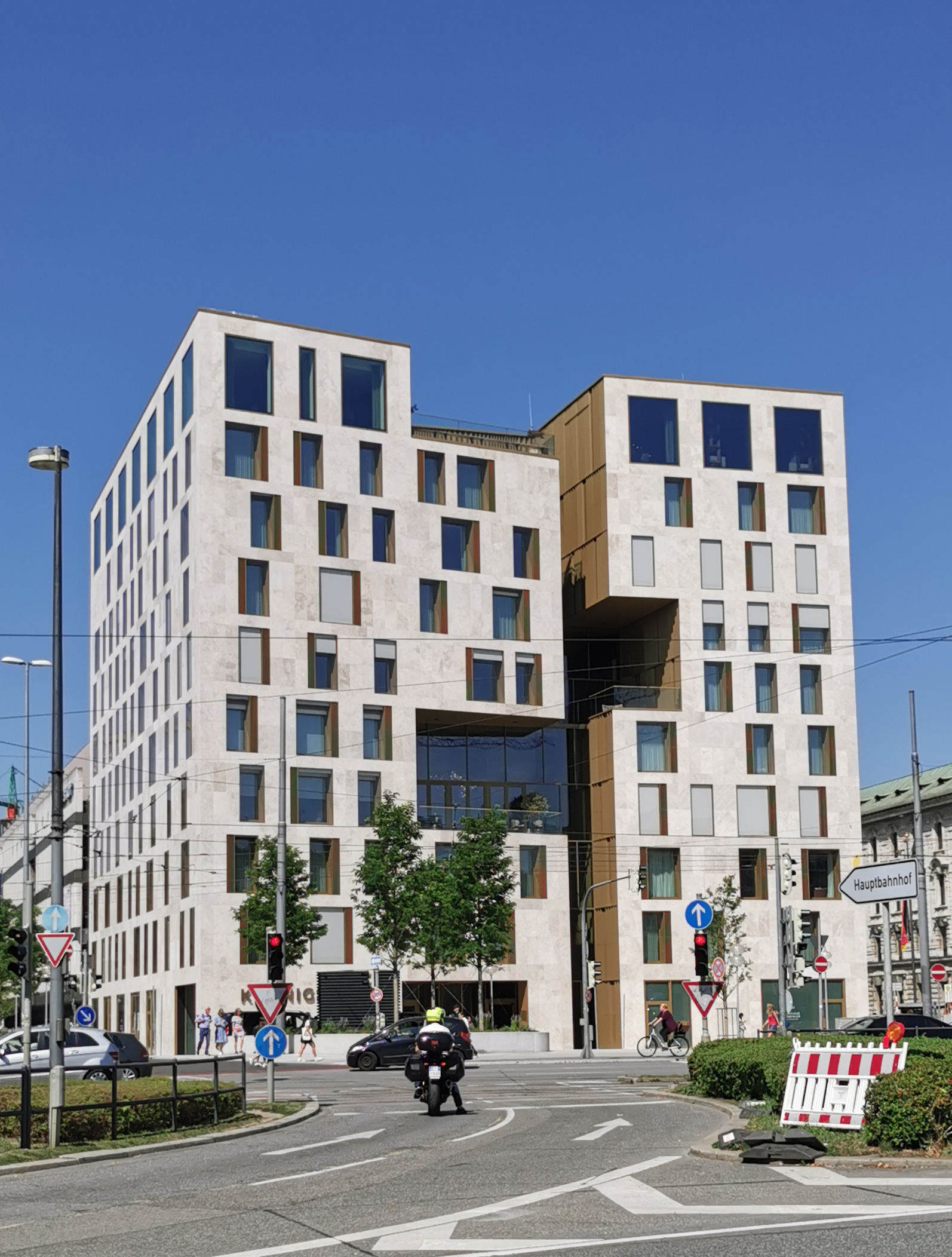
The current Koenigshof, opened in 2024.

Koenigshof, a Luxury Collection Hotel is a luxury hotel in Munich, Germany opened in 2024. It sits on the site of two historic hotels with the same name. The first was destroyed in WWII. The second was demolished in 2019.

== Location ==
The hotel is located in the Munich city district named Ludwigsvorstadt, just a few meters west of the historic square Karlsplatz (Stachus). Originally, a roundabout similar to the east side of the square was planned, yet it was never realized. The hotel is situated at the apex of the proposed half-circle across from the Karlstor.

== History ==
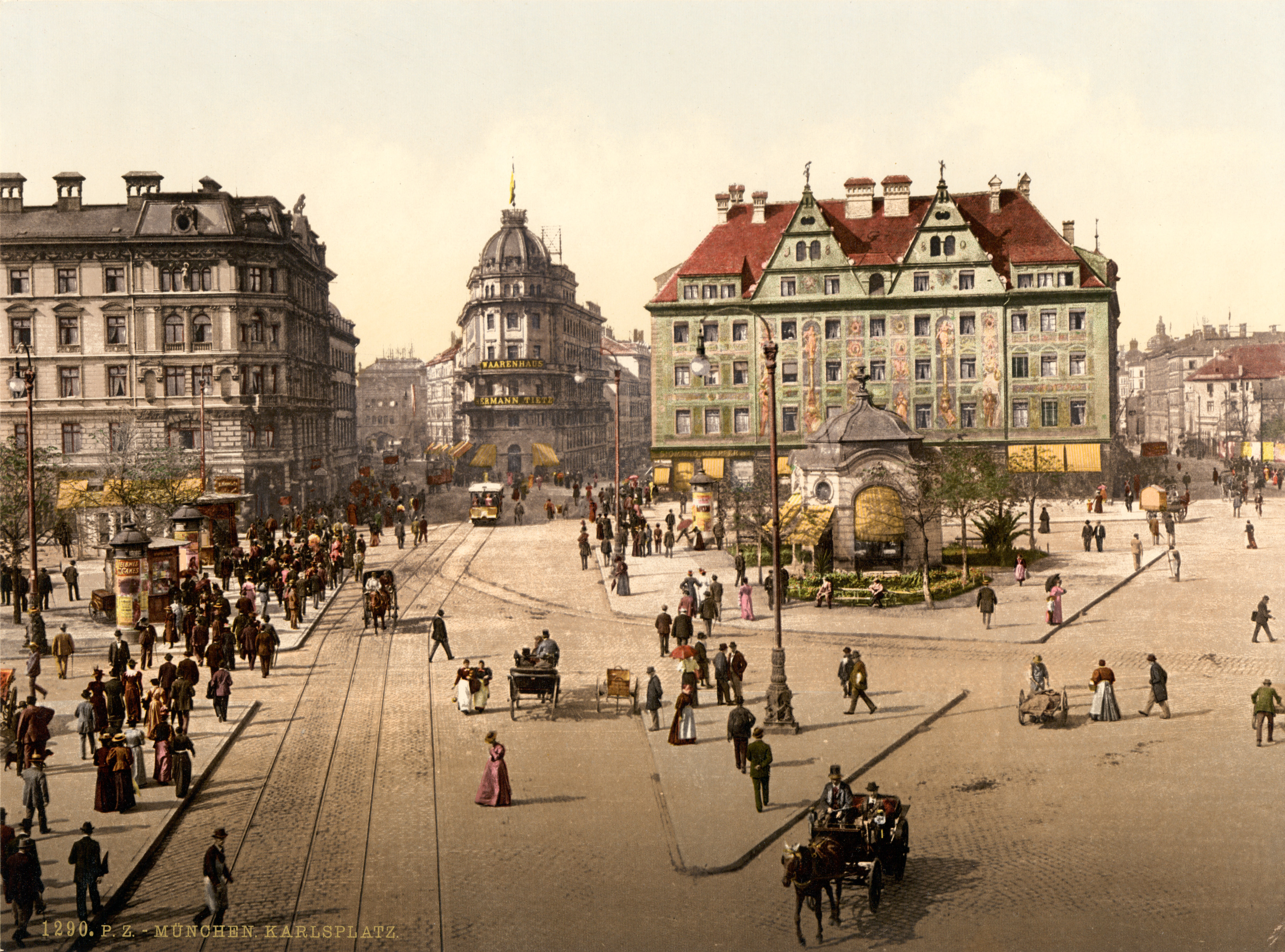
Hotel Bellevue (later Hotel Der Königshof) on right, late 19th century.

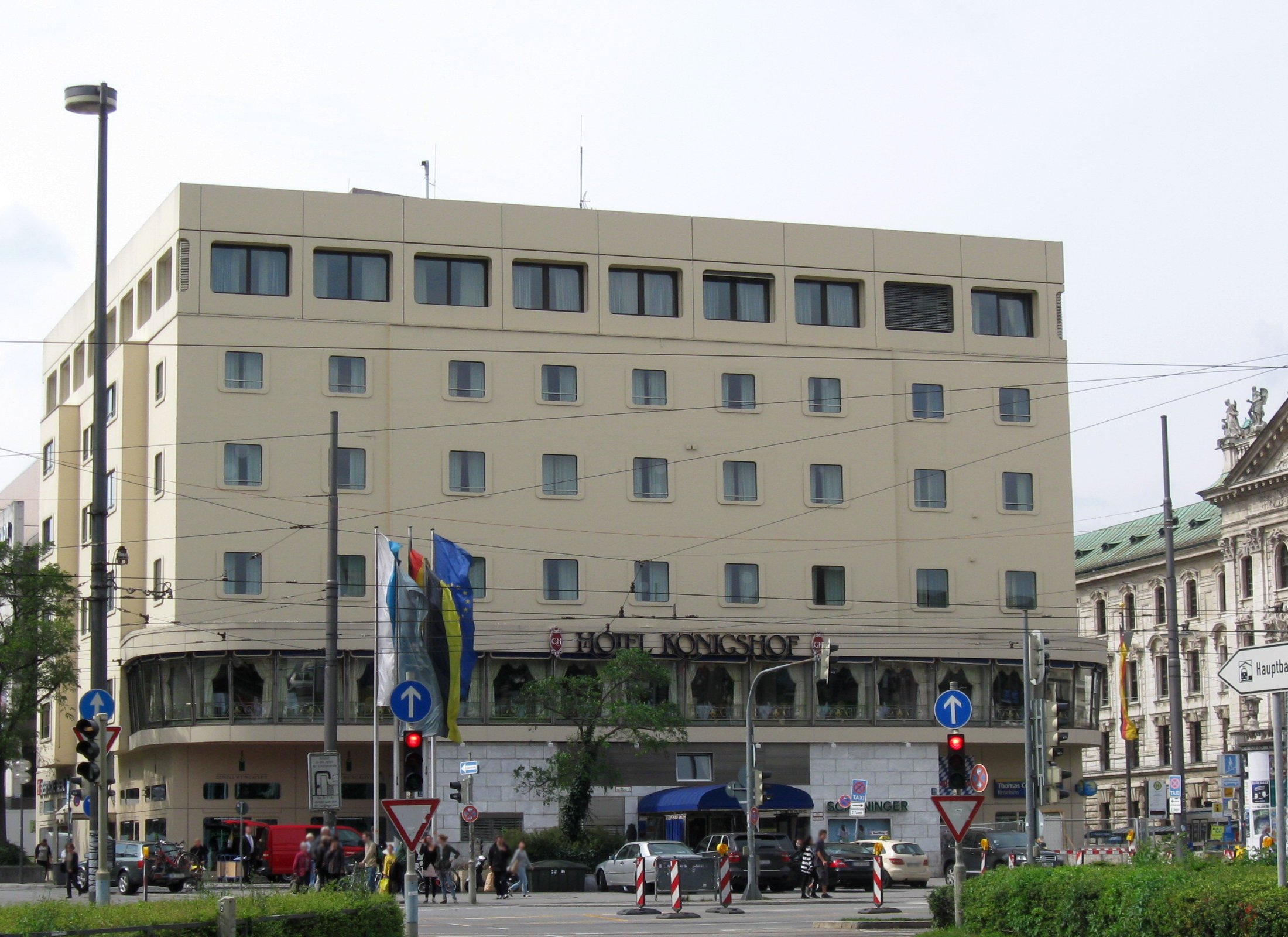
The second Hotel Königshof, demolished in 2019.

=== First structure - Hotel Bellevue/Hotel Der Königshof - 1866-1944 ===
In the beginning of the 19th century, the architect Gustav Vorherr received the land on which the hotel is located from King Max I. Joseph for his service regarding the expansion of the city. The architect eventually built a private residence in the classical style. The house, owned by Baron von Sternbach, served as a meeting place for a group of scholars who were called to Munich by Maximilian I. Joseph (Bavaria). The guests included writers such as Paul Heyse, Emanuel Geibel, Friedrich Bodenstedt, as well as the art historian and poet Adolf Friedrich von Schack, court theatre director Francis von Dingelstedt, and Franz von Kobell. In 1866, the building with the central location between the city center and the main train station became Hotel Bellevue. In 1880, the hotel was significantly remodeled, with the addition of a double-gabled roof and a huge mural on the facade, painted by Claudius Schraudolph the Elder. After the beginning of World War I, the hotel was given the more patriotic-sounding name Hotel Der Königshof. In 1938, the hotel, which consisted of 200 beds at the time, was taken over by Karl and Anna Geisel. Both started as innkeepers at the Oktoberfest Löwenbräu beer tent, and also owned several wine farms. During World War II, in 1944, the hotel was destroyed by Allied air raids.

=== Second structure - Hotel Der Königshof - 1955-2019 ===
The Geisel family rebuilt the Hotel Der Königshof, which reopened in 1955. From 1970-1972, a complete renovation was undertaken. By the 1980s, the hotel's name had been changed slightly, to the Hotel Königshof. The hotel offered 71 single and double rooms and 16 suites, as well as a 180-space underground garage. The hotel's gourmet restaurant Königshof was awarded one Michelin star and 18 out of 20 points from Gault-Millau. In 2012, plans were announced to replace the hotel with a new structure. The second hotel structure was demolished in 2019. In 2021, the business was sold by the Geisel family's Geisel Privathotels company to Inka Karlsplatz, a company owned by Munich entrepreneur Hans Inselkammer.

=== Third structure - Koenigshof, a Luxury Collection Hotel - 2024 ===
The third hotel structure, designed by Nieto Sobejano Arquitectos, opened on 13 June 2024 as Koenigshof, a Luxury Collection Hotel, a hotel chain brand of Marriott International.
