= Geisel Privathotels =

German hospitality company

Coordinates: 48°8′23″N 11°33′44″E

- Company type: Private company
- Industry: Hospitality
- Founded: 1900
- Products: Hotels; Restaurants
- Website: geisel-privathotels.de

Geisel Privathotels is a privately owned hospitality group founded in 1900 operating three hotels and a restaurant in Munich, Germany.

== History ==
The Geisel Family began working in the hotel and restaurant industry at the beginning of the 20th century by managing the Löwenbräu beer tent at the Munich Oktoberfest as of 1900. Afterwards, Karl and Anna Geisel opened the restaurant "Pasinger Weinbauer" in 1923, which was quickly followed by three further restaurants. In 1935, the family opened their first hotel, Hotel Rheinhof at Munich main station. The following year, they purchased the Hotel Excelsior, which was followed by the addition of the Hotel Königshof.

In 1943, both Hotel Rheinhof and Hotel Königshof were largely destroyed by bombing raids. In 1945, Hotel Excelsior had been confiscated and used as command headquarters by the Allied Forces. It was returned to the Geisel's in 1956 and refurbished until its reopening in 1959. By 1950, Hotel Königshof had been rebuilt and subsequently underwent another major redesign between 1970-1972.

In 1995, they opened the Cosmopolitan Hotel in Munich's Schwabing district. This was followed by the opening of their fourth hotel, Design Hotel Anna, located in Munich's city centre adjacent to Hotel Königshof and nearby Hotel Excelsior in 2002. In 2003, Hotel Königshof was included in The Leading Small Hotels of the World.

In 2017, another new hotel, Beyond, was opened while the Cosmopolitan Hotel had been refurbished and rebranded to Schwabinger Wahrheit in 2018. In 2020, Hotel Anna had been sold, followed by Hotel Königshof during its reconstruction in 2021. Also in 2020, the group closed its two Michelin star restaurant Werneckhof in the wake of the COVID-19 pandemic.

== Properties ==
As of 2024, Geisel Privathotels owns and manages three upscale to luxury hotels, all within Munich:

- Beyond by Geisel
- Excelsior by Geisel
- Schwabinger Wahrheit by Geisel

Additionally, they operate a restaurant (Vinothek by Geisel) and a wine shop (Geisels Weingalerie).
