= Old Academy (Munich) =

Historic building in Munich, Germany

Coordinates: 48°08′20″N 11°34′11″E

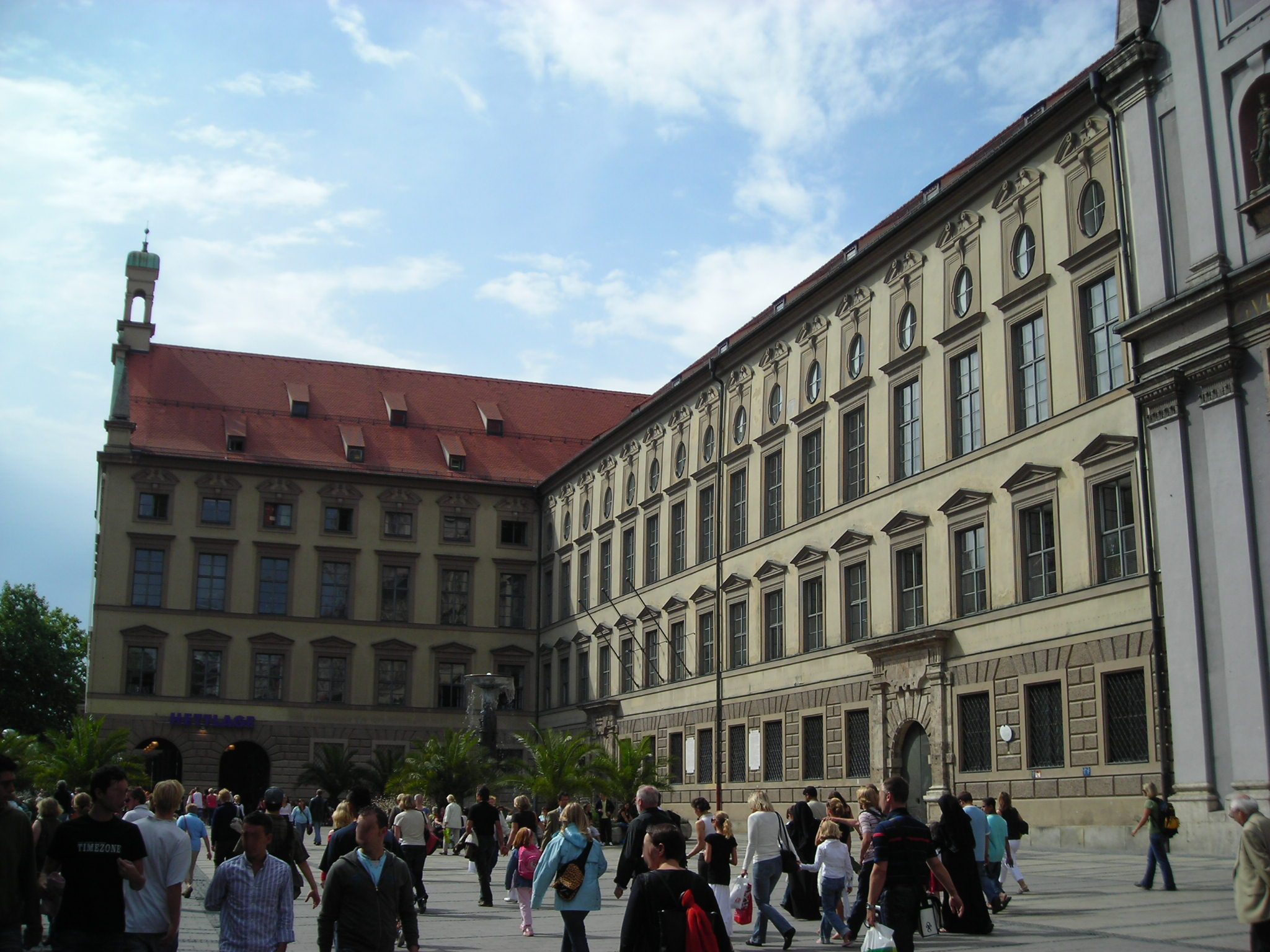
The Old Academy, view from Neuhauser Straße

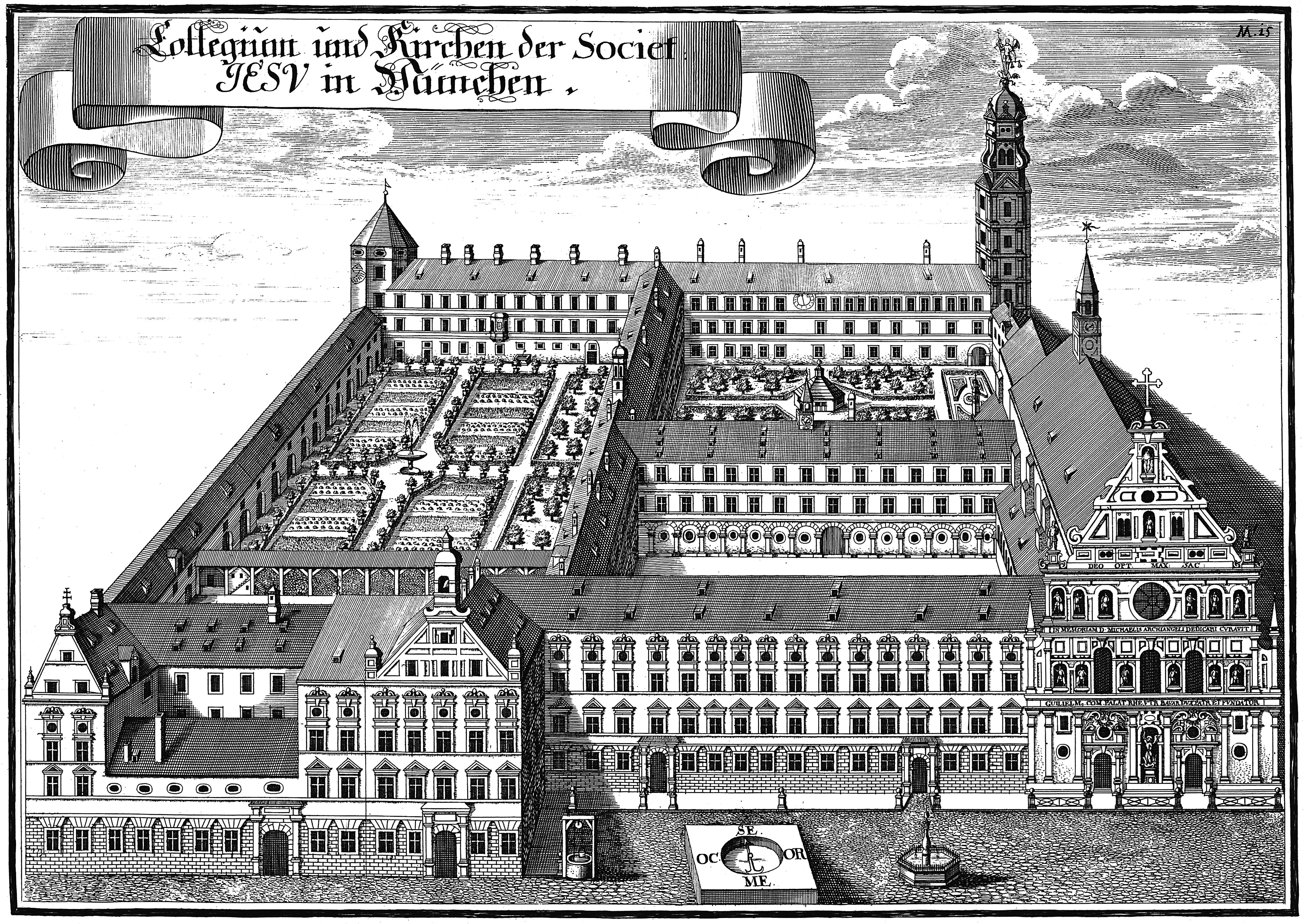
The Wilhelminum ca 1700 by Michael Wening

The Old Academy (German: Alte Akademie), also called Wilhelminum, is a building in the center of Munich, Germany. Dating from the 16th century, it has a Renaissance facade and four inner courtyards.

== History ==
William V, Duke of Bavaria ordered the construction of a building for the college and the school of the Jesuits next to his St. Michael's Church. The college was established 1583–1590. It is unclear who designed the building, but it was probably as Friedrich Sustris.

After the expulsion of the Jesuits in 1773 the building became a cantonment for cadets of the army. From 1783 to 1826, it housed the Court Library and Archives, and then a school of painting and sculpture (hence the designation "Academy"). From 1826 to 1840, LMU Munich had its temporary domicile in the building. After severe destruction during the Second World War (1944) it was rebuilt by Josef Wiedemann to house the Bavarian Statistical Office.

The Old Academy is under renovation from 2020 to 2023 and shops, offices and apartments should come in there when the renovation is finished.

The Japanese fashion retail group Fast Retailing signed a lease for a new flagship store of its fashion brand Uniqlo in autumn 2022 and Uniqlo will open a store when the renovation is fished in 2023 or 2024 (not certain when).

== See also ==
- List of Jesuit sites
