= St. Michael's Church, Munich =

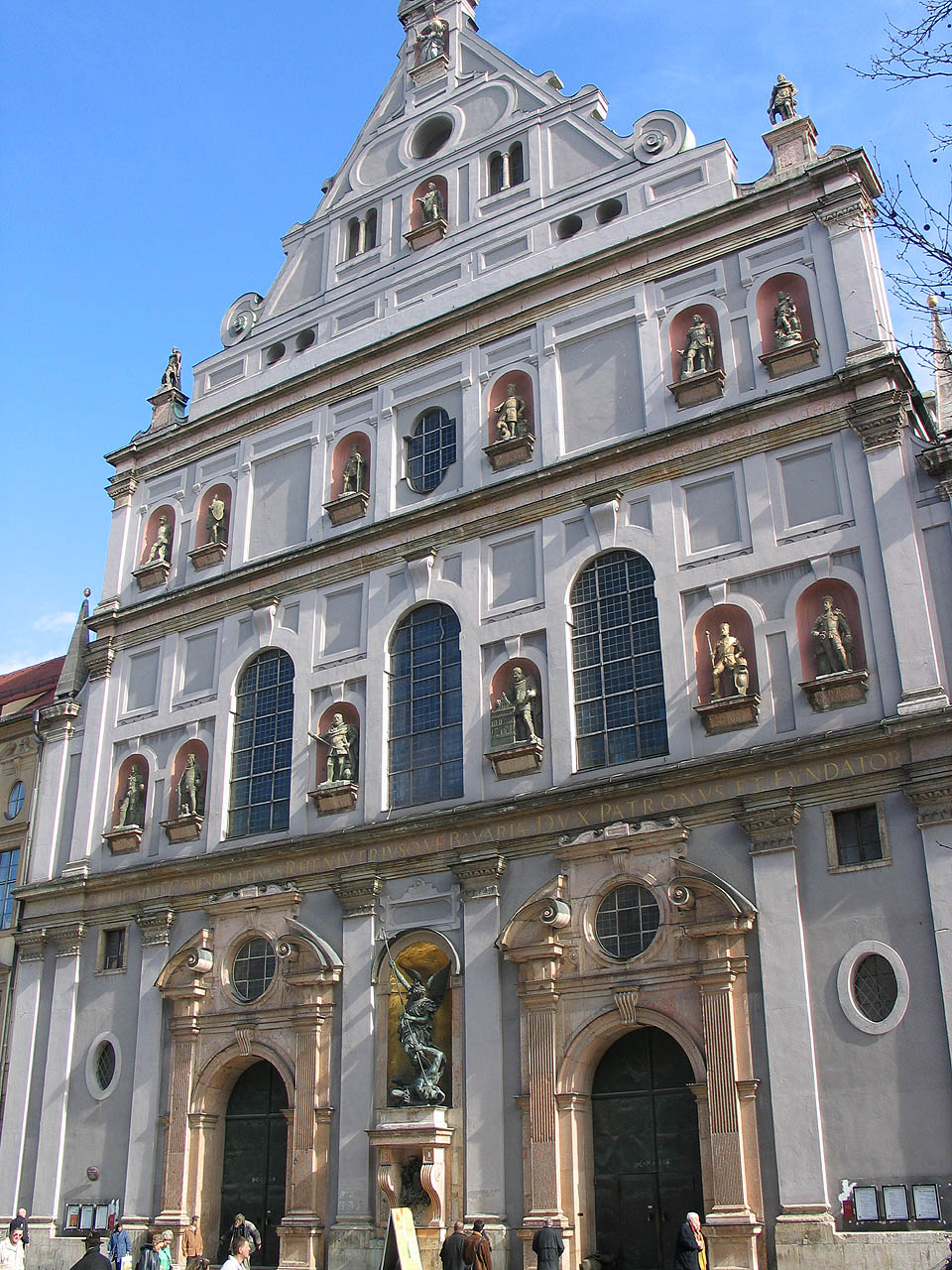

- Location within Bavaria Location within Germany
- 48°08′20″N 11°34′14″E
- Location: Neuhauser Straße 6 Munich, Bavaria
- Country: Germany
- Denomination: Roman Catholic
- Website: www.st-michael-muenchen.de

History
- Status: Parish church
- Consecrated: 6 July 1597

Architecture
- Functional status: Active
- Style: Renaissance
- Groundbreaking: 18 April 1583

Administration
- Archdiocese: Munich and Freising

Clergy
- Rector: P. Karl Kern SJ

St. Michael's is a Jesuit church in Munich, capital city of the state of Bavaria, Germany. It is the largest Renaissance church north of the Alps. The style of the building had an enormous influence on Southern German early Baroque architecture.

== History ==
In 1556, Albert V, Duke of Bavaria, granted the Society of Jesus (Jesuits) permission to establish what is now Wilhelmsgymnasium in Munich, thus establishing the order's presence in the city. The collegiate church was only established during the reign of his son William V, Duke of Bavaria, also known as "the Pious", who was a supporter of the Jesuits' Counter Reformation tenets.

The church was finally consecrated in 1597, after fourteen years of construction. When the Jesuits were suppressed and banned from most Catholic territories in Europe, the church came into possession of the Bavarian Royal Family and eventually the State of Bavaria, when Germany became a republic.

== Architecture ==
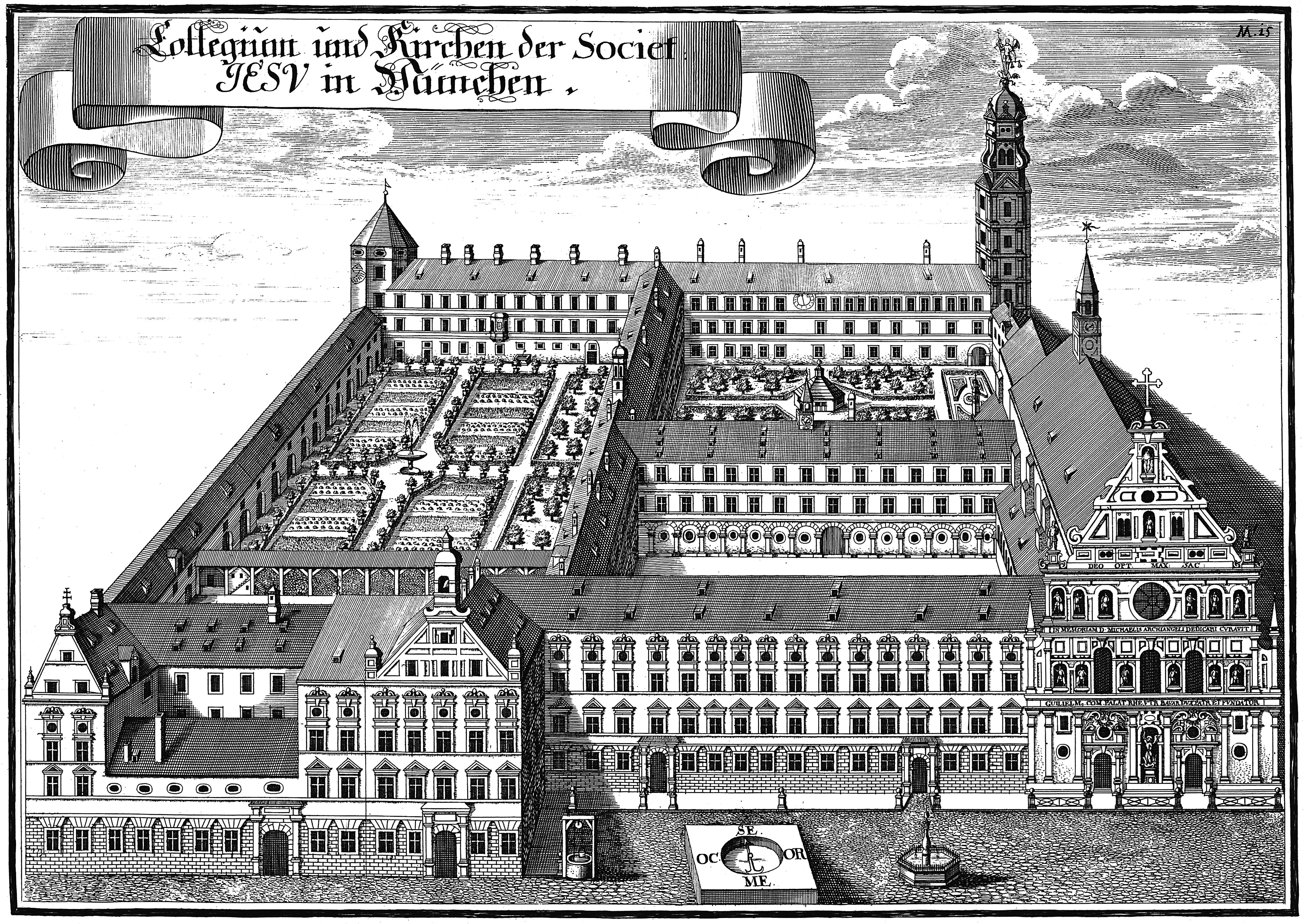
St Michael's Church, c. 1700 (copperplate engraving by Michael Wening).

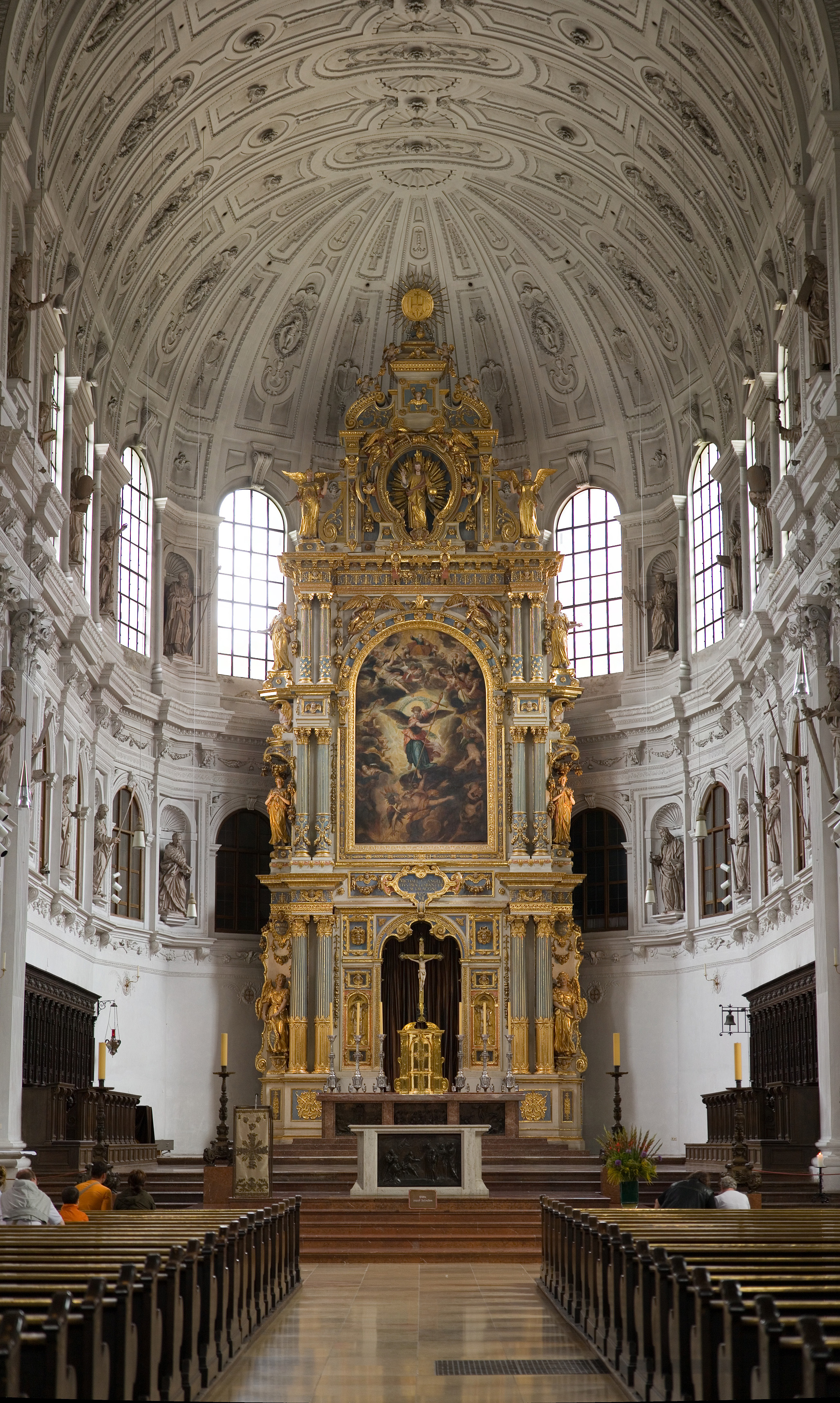
The High Altar

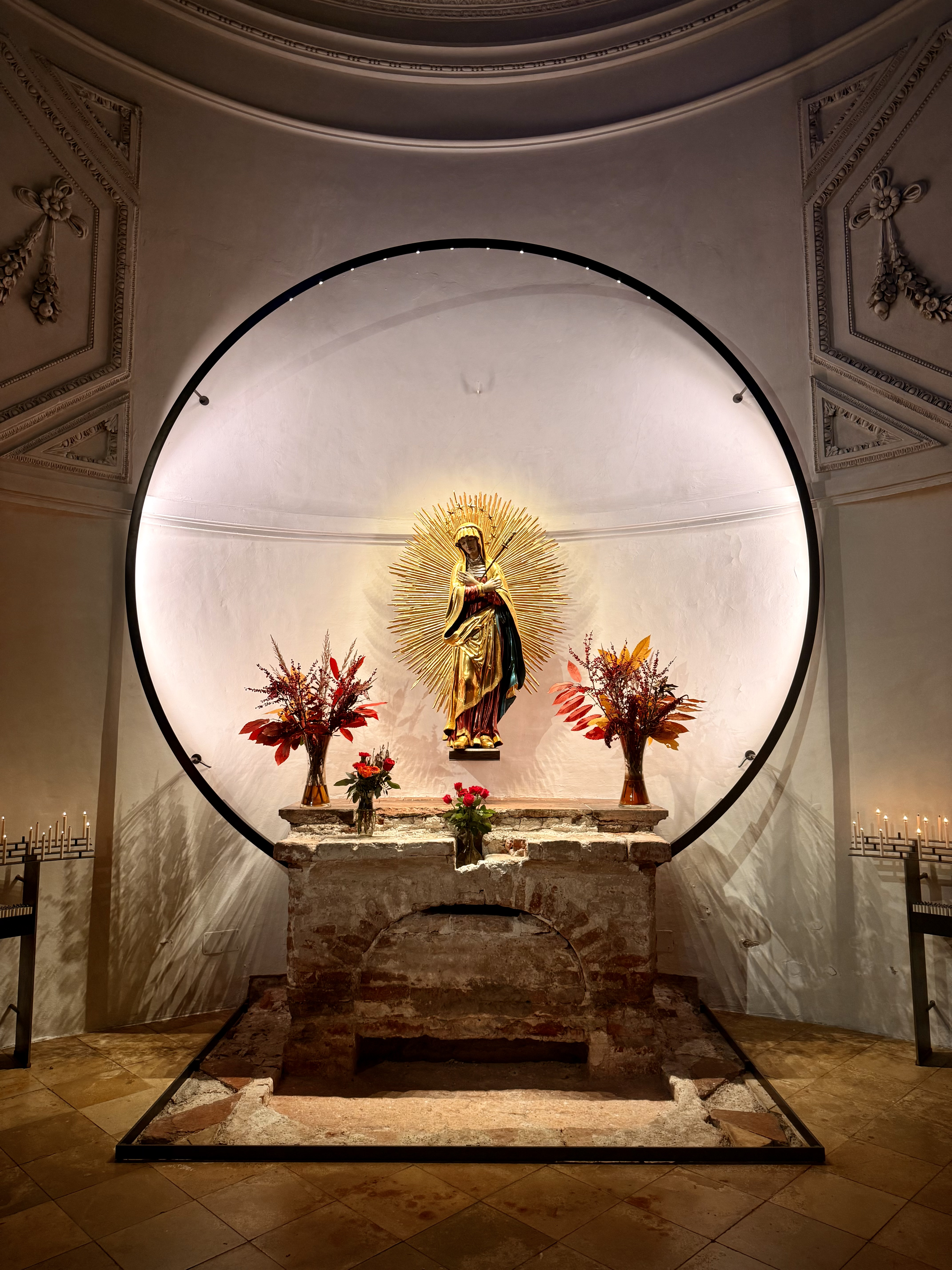
The Marian Chapel (redesigned in 2024) with the Mater Dolorosa (1855). The damaged base of the original altar, lost in WWII, links Mary’s sorrow to the church’s own “scar of war”. St. Michael’s, as the place of ministry of Father Rupert Mayer SJ, was a key site of Catholic resistance to Nazism.

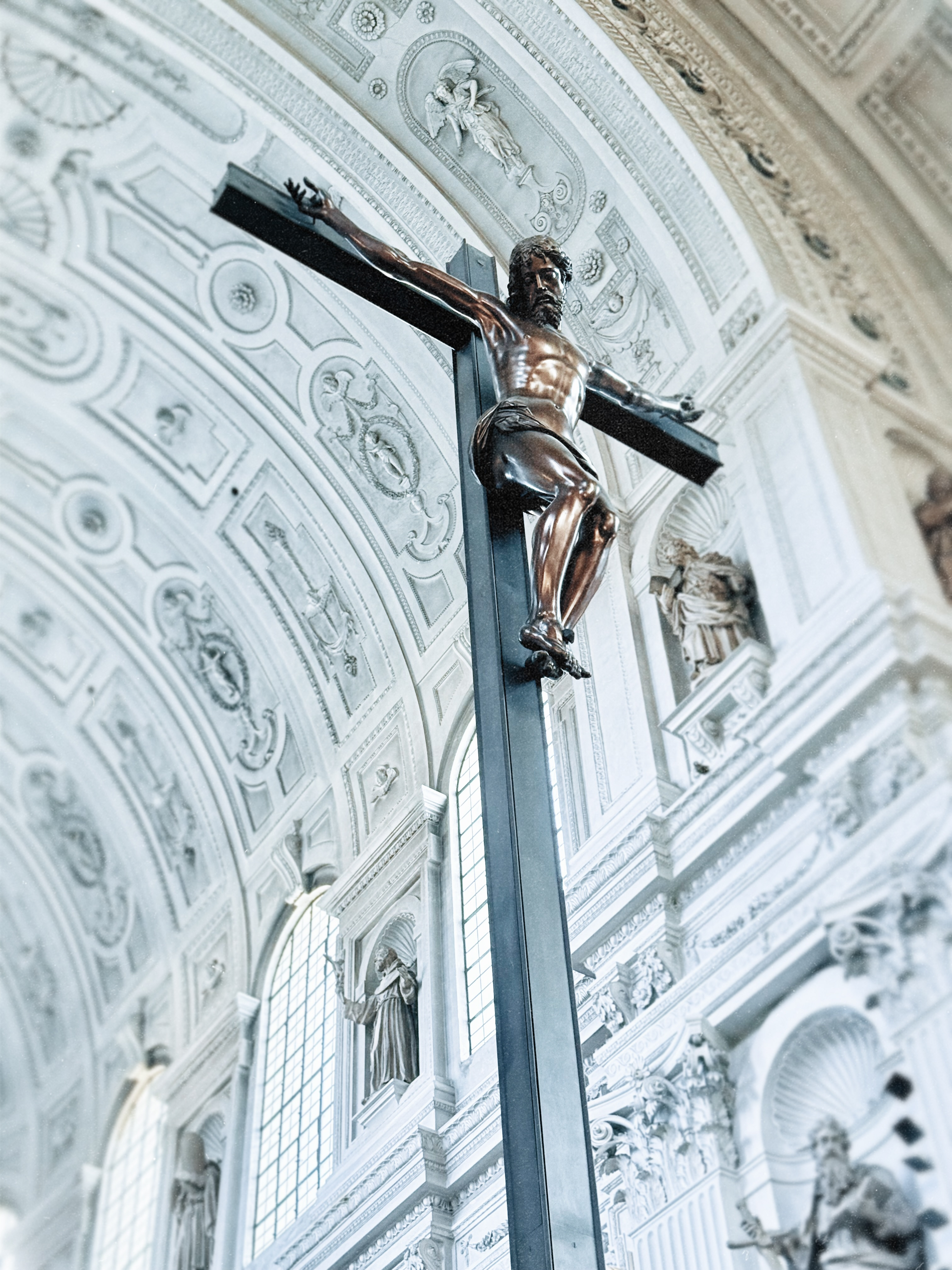
Crucifix by Giambologna (1594)

The church was built by William V, Duke of Bavaria, between 1583 and 1597 as a spiritual center for the Counter Reformation. The foundation stone was laid in 1585.

In order to realise his ambitious plans for the church and the adjoining college, Duke William had 87 houses in the best location pulled down, ignoring the protests of the citizens. The church was erected in two stages. In the first stage (1583–88), the church was built by the model of Il Gesù in Rome and given a barrel-vaulted roof by an unknown architect, the vault being the largest in the world apart from that of St Peter's Basilica in Rome, spanning freely more than 20 meters.

When the church was built, there were doubts about the stability of the vaulting. But it was the tower that collapsed in 1590, destroying the just completed quire. Duke William V took it as a bad omen and so planned to build a much larger church. The second phase of construction continued until the consecration of the church in 1597. Friedrich Sustris built on to the undamaged nave a new quire and a transept and a magnificent facade. The church is 78.2 meters long, 20.3 meters wide and 28.2 meters high.

The facade is impressive and contains standing statues of Duke Wilhelm and earlier rulers of the Bavarian Wittelsbach dynasty, cast in bronze, in the form of a family tree. Hubert Gerhard's large bronze statue between the two entrances shows the Archangel Michael fighting for the Faith and killing the Evil in the shape of a humanoid demon.

The interior is a representation of the triumph of Roman Catholicism in Bavaria during the Counter-Reformation. The heavily indented chancel arch as well as the short side aisles and even the side chapels are designed as triumphal arches in the ancient model. A very deep choir room adjoins the mighty nave. The stucco decoration of the nave represents the life of Jesus Christ. The altarpiece "Annunciation" was created by Peter Candid (1587). The sculpture of the holy angel in the nave from Hubert Gerhard (1595) was originally intended for the tomb of William V, which was not completed.

Having suffered severe damage during the Second World War, the church was restored in 1946–48. Finally, between 1980 and 1983, the stucco-work was restored. The spire which lost its steepletop in World War II is situated further north next to the former convent.

== Burial places ==
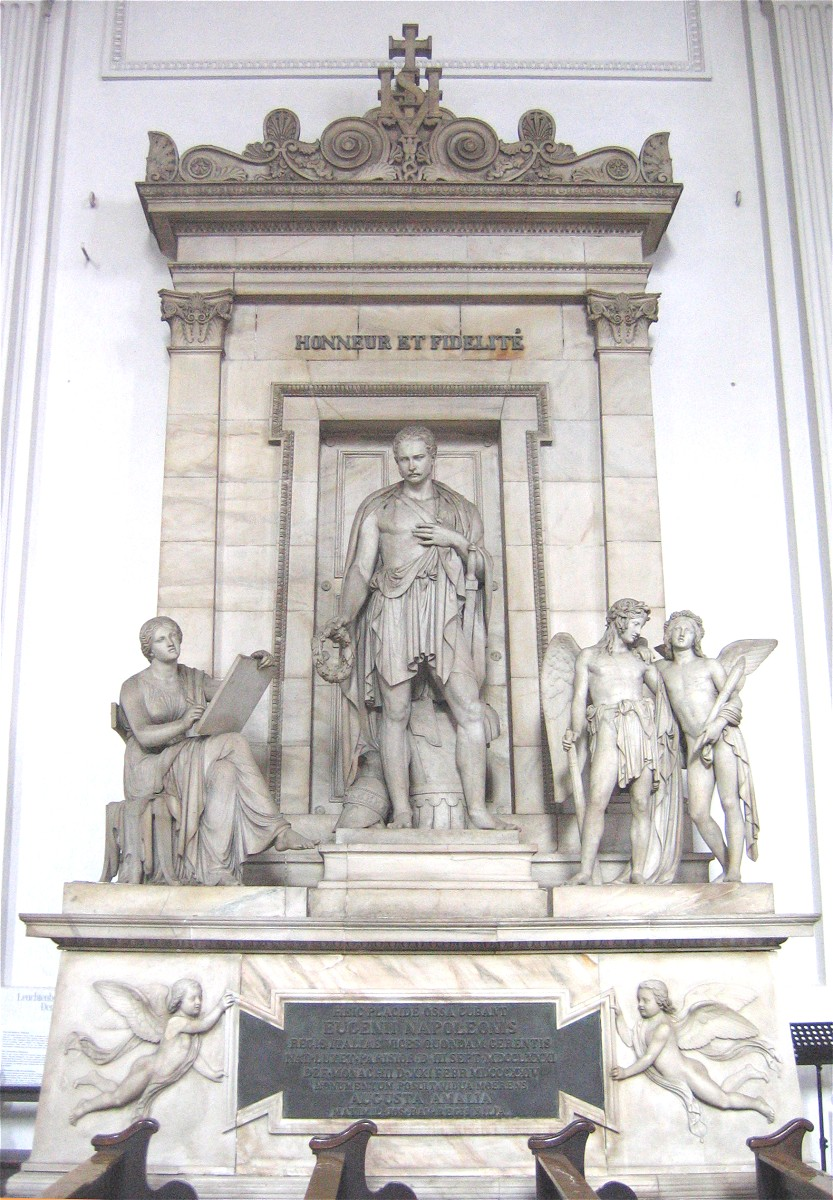
Monument to Eugène de Beauharnais by Bertel Thorwaldsen.

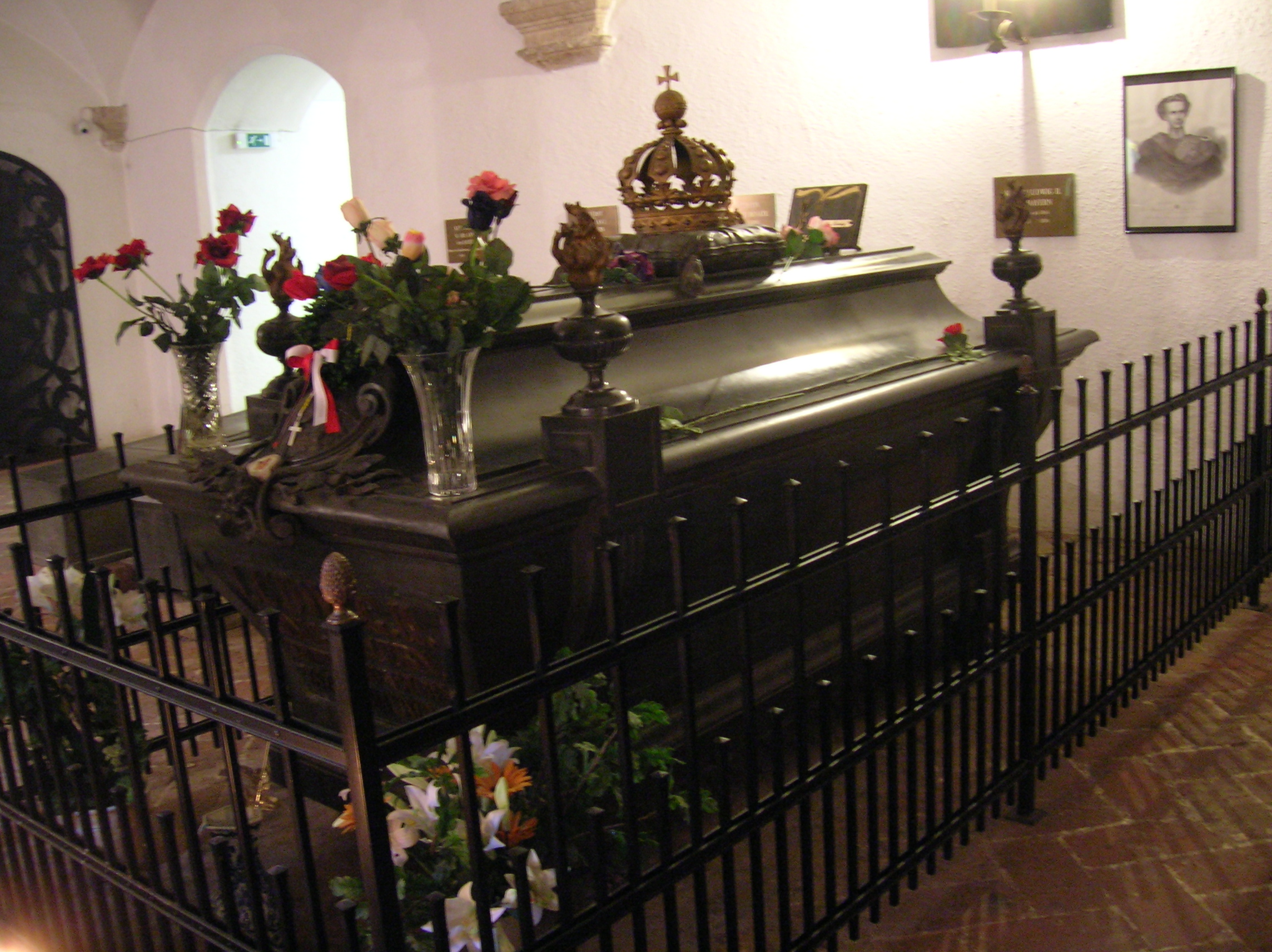
Coffin of King Ludwig II.

The church crypt contains the tomb of Eugène de Beauharnais. A monument was erected by Bertel Thorwaldsen in 1830 in the church. Eugène was the son of Josephine de Beauharnais, Napoleon's wife and her first husband, general Alexandre de Beauharnais. He married a daughter of King Maximilian I Joseph of Bavaria in 1806 and was created Duke of Leuchtenberg in 1817. In the right transept, there is a cross monument of Giovanni da Bologna.

The crypt contains among others the tombs of these members of the Wittelsbach dynasty:

- William V, Duke of Bavaria, (reg. 1579–1597)
- Maximilian I, Elector of Bavaria, (reg. 1597–1651)
- Charles II August, Duke of Zweibrücken
- King Ludwig II of Bavaria, (reg. 1864–1886)
- King Otto of Bavaria, (reg. 1886–1913), Ludwig's younger brother
- Prince Leopold of Bavaria, titular King of Greece.
- Archduchess Gisela of Austria, eldest surviving child of Emperor Franz Joseph I of Austria and Empress Elisabeth

== See also ==
- Saint Michael: Roman Catholic traditions and views
- List of Jesuit sites

== Sources ==
- Egert-Romanowska, Joanna (2001). Germany. London: Dorling Kindersley. ISBN 0-7513-0888-9.
- Nohbauer, Hans (1994). Munich City of the Arts. Munich: Hirmer Verlag. ISBN 3-7774-6250-0.
