= Neuhauser Straße =

Pedestrian zone in Munich, Germany

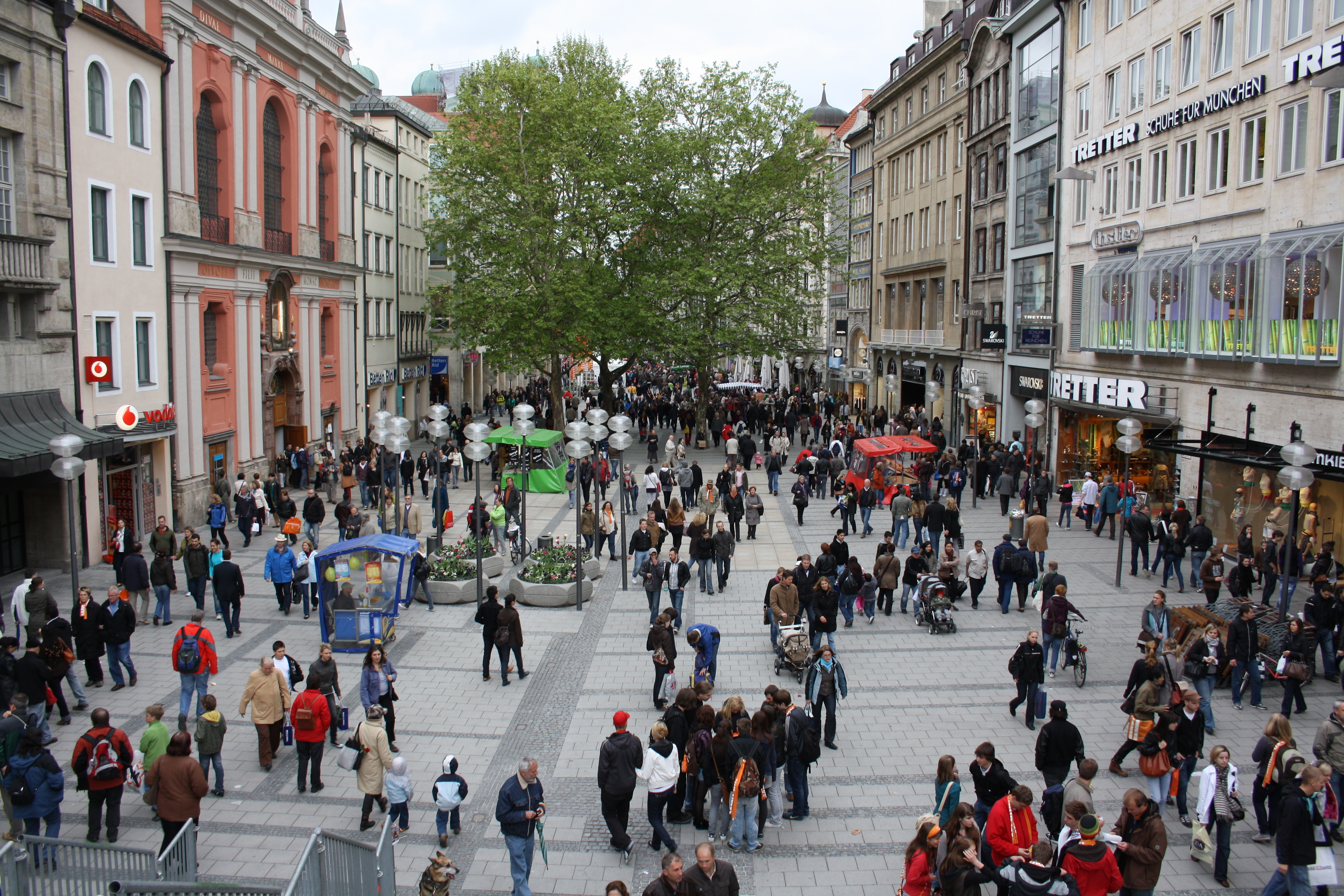
- Neuhauser Straße seen from the Karlstor

- Location within Germany
- Former names: Karlstraße, Neuhausergasse
- Namesake: Neuhausen-Nymphenburg
- Length: 350 m (1,150 ft)
- Location: Munich
- Nearest metro station: Munich Karlsplatz station (S1, S2, S3, S4, S6, S8, U4, U5)
- Coordinates: 48.138563°N 11.568701°E
- Major junctions: Färbergraben, Augustinerstraße, Ettstraße, Eisenmannstraße, Kapellenstraße, Herzog-Max-Straße, Herzog-Wilhelm-Straße

Construction
- Inauguration: 1293

Neuhauser Straße is part of the first and largest pedestrian zone in Munich's Old Town. Here, many retail shops and restaurants are to be found.

== Location and direction ==
The road runs almost straight ahead in the southeast-northwest direction out of town, from the intersection Färbergraben, or Augustinerstraße, to Karlsplatz (Stachus). It has a length of about 350 meters. In the direction of Marienplatz, Neuhauser Straße becomes Kaufingerstraße. Below the Neuhauser Straße and the Kaufingerstraße are the main lines of the S-Bahn that runs between the stops Marienplatz and Karlsplatz.

== History ==
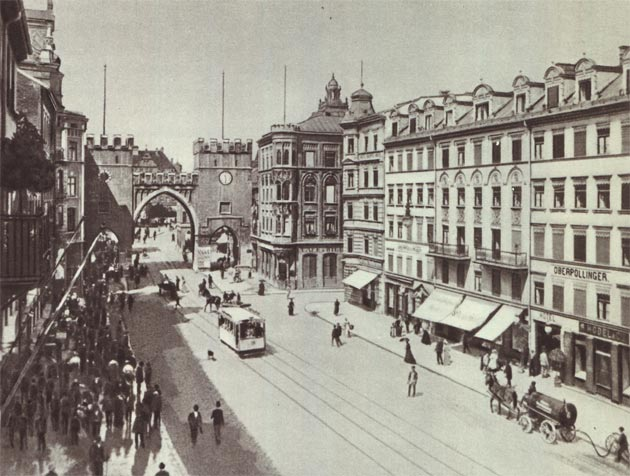
Neuhauser Straße (partial view, 1900)

The street exists since at least 1293 (first mention) and was called Karlstraße from 1815 to 1828, then Neuhausergasse. It was rebuilt in 1972 from a main traffic connection with two tram-rails into a pedestrian zone; the reason for this was the 1972 Olympic Games with a huge influx of additional traffic to be expected. The street is named after the former village and today's Neuhausen district, where the road leads out of town. South along the road is the Angerviertel (Angers quarter) and north the Hackenviertel (Hacken quarter).

== Buildings (selection) ==
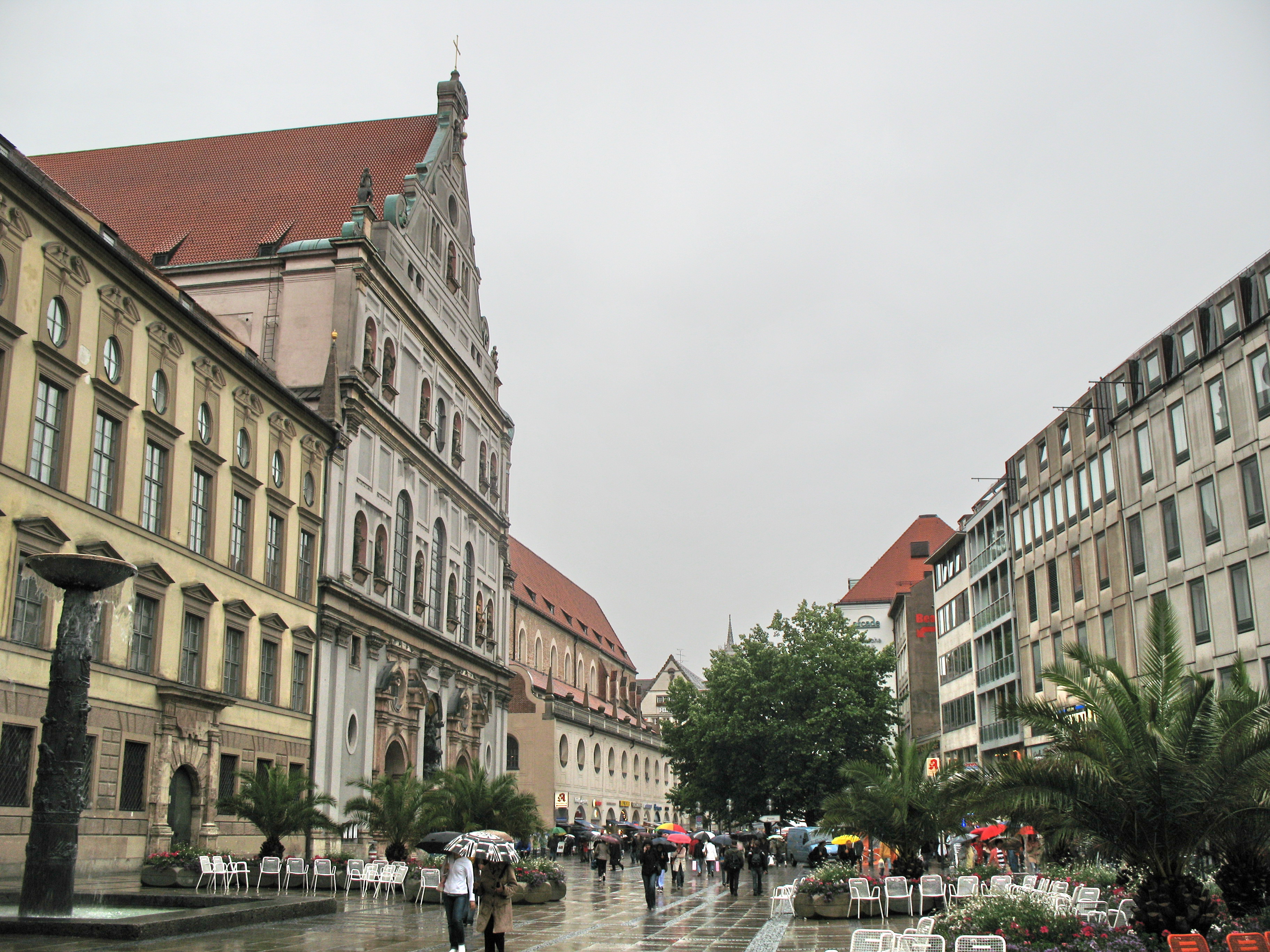
Neuhauser Straße with St. Michael's and the Monastery church of St. John the Baptist and St. John the Evangelist of the Augustinian Hermits

- No. 2 is the former Augustinerkirche, which belonged to Augustinerkloster (Augustiner Monastery); today there are the German Hunting and Fishing Museum and shops, in the annex behind the offices of the Polizeipräsidium München (police headquarter) (Ettstraße 2-4).
- No. 6: St. Michael's church building.
- No. 8: Old Academy (Wilhelminum), former Jesuit College, where, from 1956 to 2012, the service building Bavarian State Office for Statistics and Data Processing was located in front of this building is the Richard Strauss Fountain, in the west wing was the Department store Hettlage
- No. 17: former commercial building H. Ehrlicher, now department store Zweiflers
- No. 18: department store Oberpollinger, formerly Karstadt
- No. 20: Fountain Satyrherme mit Knabe (so-called Brunnenbuberl)
- No. 21: new store from SportScheck
- No. 14: Bürgersaalkirche (Citizens' Hall Church)
- No. 27: Restaurant Augustinerbräu in a painted neo-Renaissance semi-detached house.
- No. 39: Saturn department store and a perfumery, former Hertie department store

Shortly before the Karlsplatz is the Karlstor (Neuhausertor).
