= Kaufingerstraße =

Street in Munich, Germany

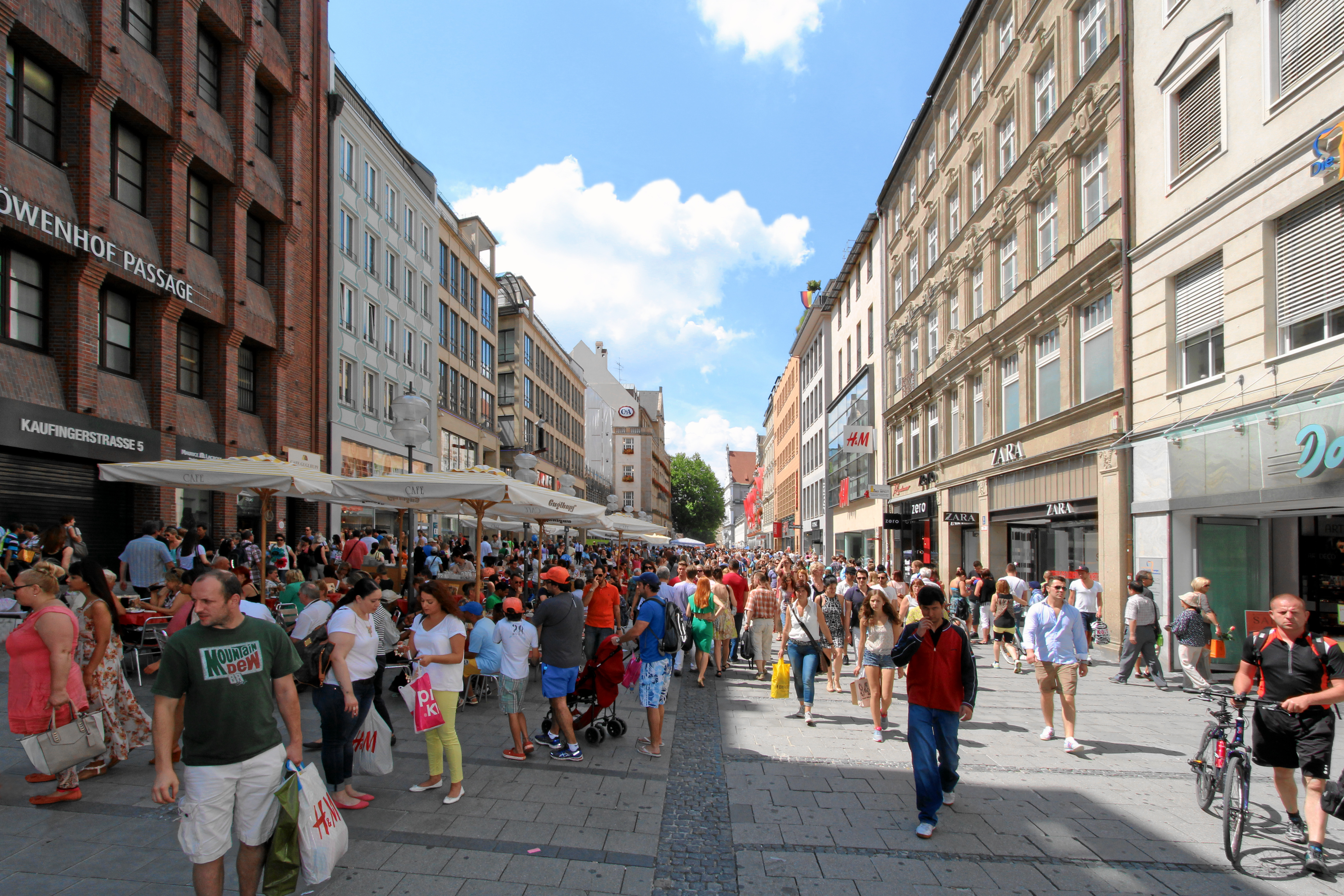
Kaufingerstraße near Marienplatz

The Kaufingerstraße is one of the oldest streets in Munich and, together with the Neuhauser Straße, one of the most important shopping streets in Munich.

== History ==
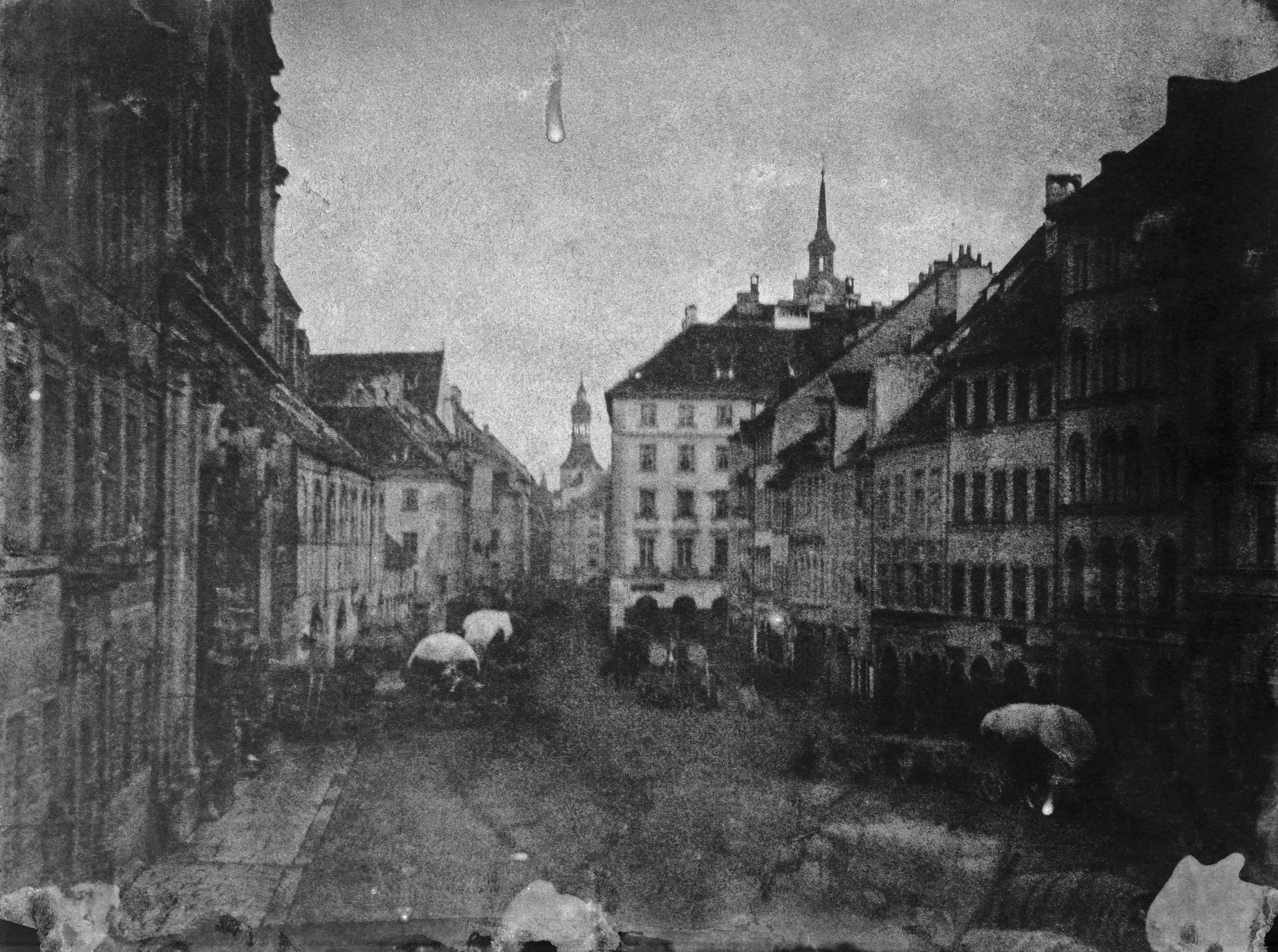
The Michaelskirche, located on the left of Neuhauser Straße with a view of Kaufingerstraße in Munich, 1839

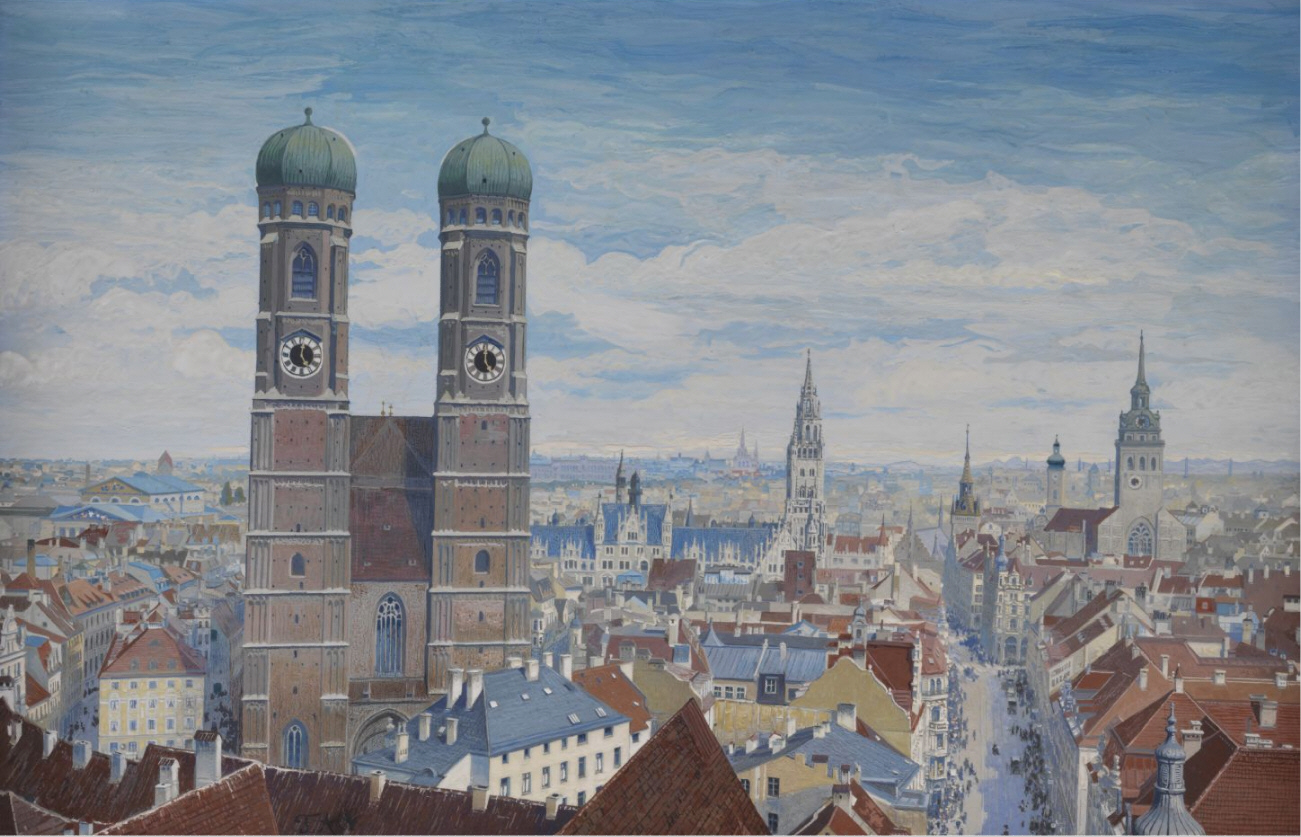
View of the Frauenkirche (left) and the Kaufingerstraße (right), around 1910

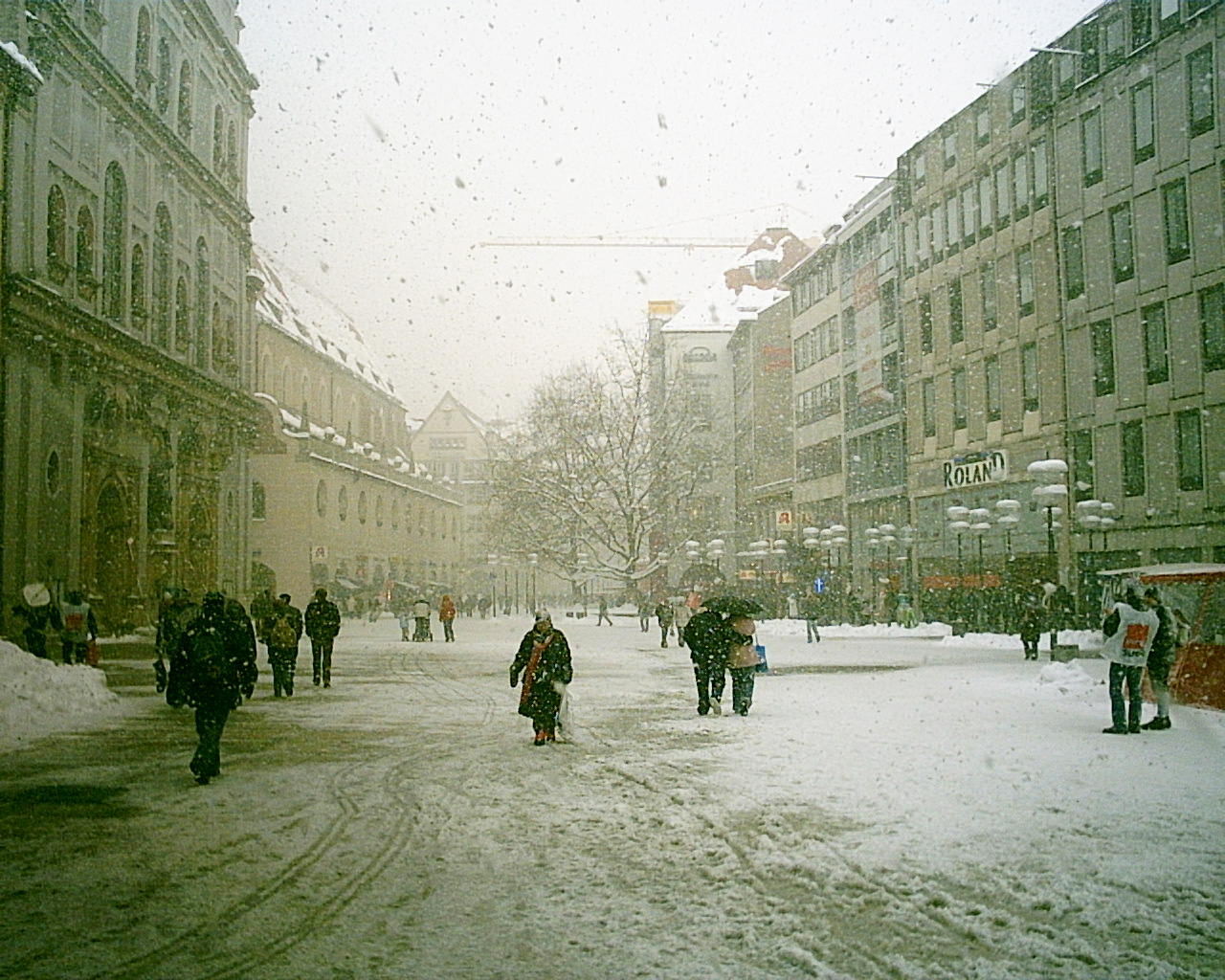
View in winter

With an average of 12,975 passers-by per hour (as of 5 May 2011), Kaufingerstraße is one of the top-selling shopping streets in Germany. The rental and construction site purchase prices are the highest in the Kaufingerstraße than in any other street in Germany. Rental prices are around 300 € and site purchase prices around 50,000 € per square meter (in 2008). In 2008, the street was one of the 10 shopping miles (9th place) with the highest rents in the world. In 2010, it was, with 11.905 passers-by per hour, in third place of the busiest shopping streets in Germany. In 2011, the Kaufingerstraße slipped to number 4 of the most visited shopping streets in Germany behind the Zeil in Frankfurt am Main (13,035 passers-by per hour). Meanwhile, the Neuhauser road placed second in the list. According to a study by Jones Lang LaSalle (JLL), it was the busiest street in Munich with 13,515 passers-by per hour on the deadline. Also in 2013, the Neuhauser Straße placed second with 11,920 passers-by, this time behind the Dortmunder Westenhellweg (12,950 passers-by). Because of this, Munich is the only German city, which has 2 shopping streets in the list of the most visited five. According to an analysis by JLL from the year 2015, Kaufingerstraße is the most expensive shopping street in Germany with a top rent of 360 Euro per square meter.
