= List of cultural history trails in Munich =

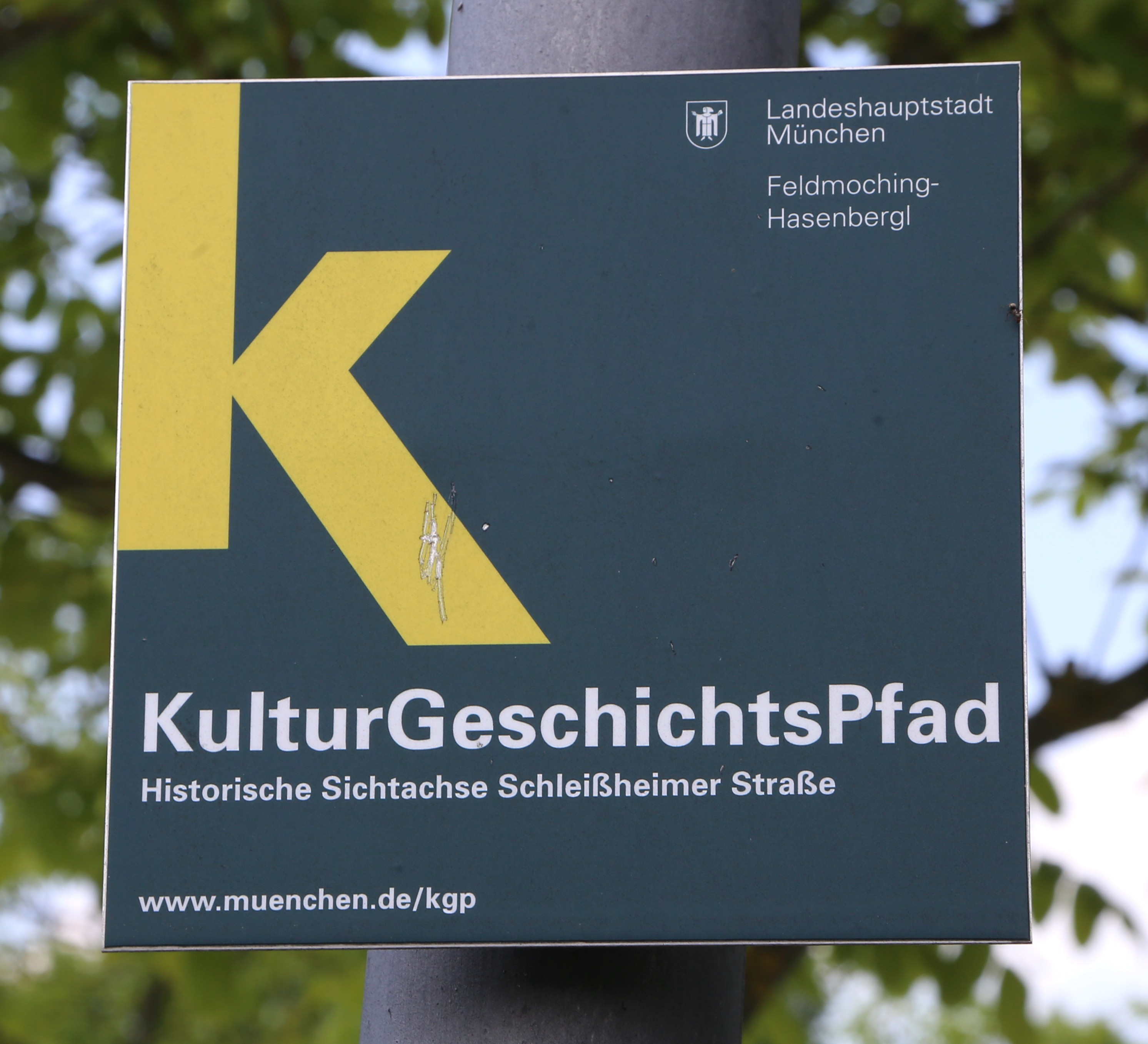
Orientation boards indicate the location

This list of cultural history trails in Munich (KulturGeschichtsPfad) lists educational trails divided according to Munich's districts along historically significant buildings, historic squares and apartments or places where remarkable personalities worked.

== Description ==
The cultural history trails are designed so that they may be covered on foot or by bicycle. On site, orientation boards indicate the respective path and the respective individual station. Accompanying brochures of the cultural history trails are available free of charge in district libraries, adult education centers and in the Landesstelle für die nichtstaatlichen Museen in Bayern (Alter Hof 1) (country office of non-governmental museums) or in the municipal tourist information offices.

The cultural history trails are based on a city council proposal from 2001.

== Tours by city districts ==
=== 2 – Ludwigsvorstadt-Isarvorstadt ===
A tour of Ludwigsvorstadt: "München Hauptbahnhof", Bayerstraße, Hackerbrücke, St. Paul's Church, Theresienwiese, Kaiser-Ludwig-Platz, Klinikviertel, Schillerstraße

A tour of the slaughter house and three-mill district: Goetheplatz, Lindwurmstraße, St. Andreas, Südbahnhof, Schlacht- und Viehhof München (slaughter house), Dreimühlenviertel, Wittelsbacherbrücke, St. Anton, Alter Südfriedhof, former gasworks, Sendlinger Tor

Along the Isar: Gärtnerplatz and Glockenbachviertel: Ludwigsbrücke, Deutsches Museum, Deutsches Patent- und Markenamt, Corneliusbrücke, Reichenbachbrücke, Gärtnerplatz, Müllerstraße, Fraunhoferstraße, Hans-Sachs-Straße, Pestalozzistraße, Pechwinkel, Karl-Heinrich-Ulrichs-Platz

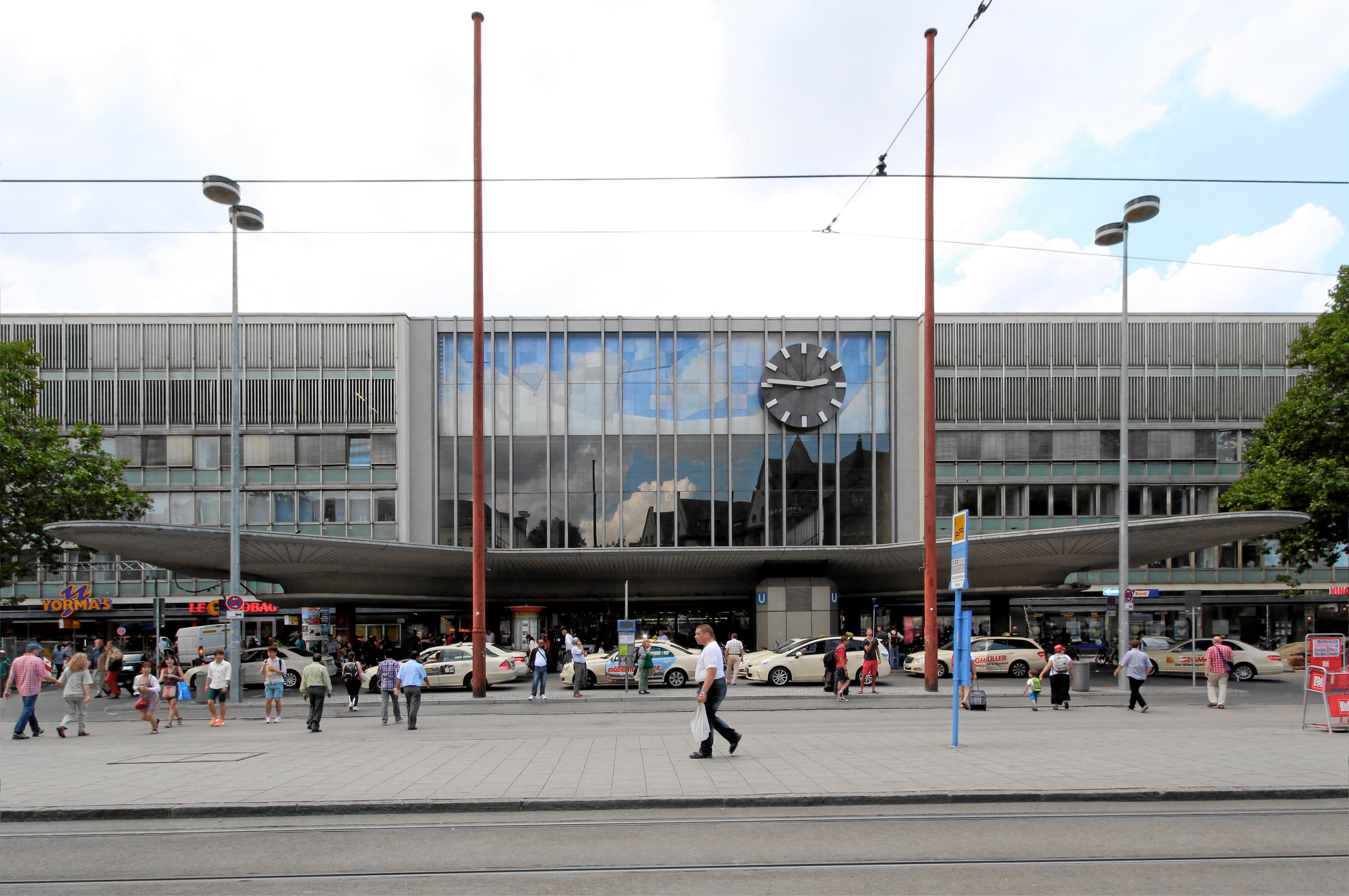
Hauptbahnhof

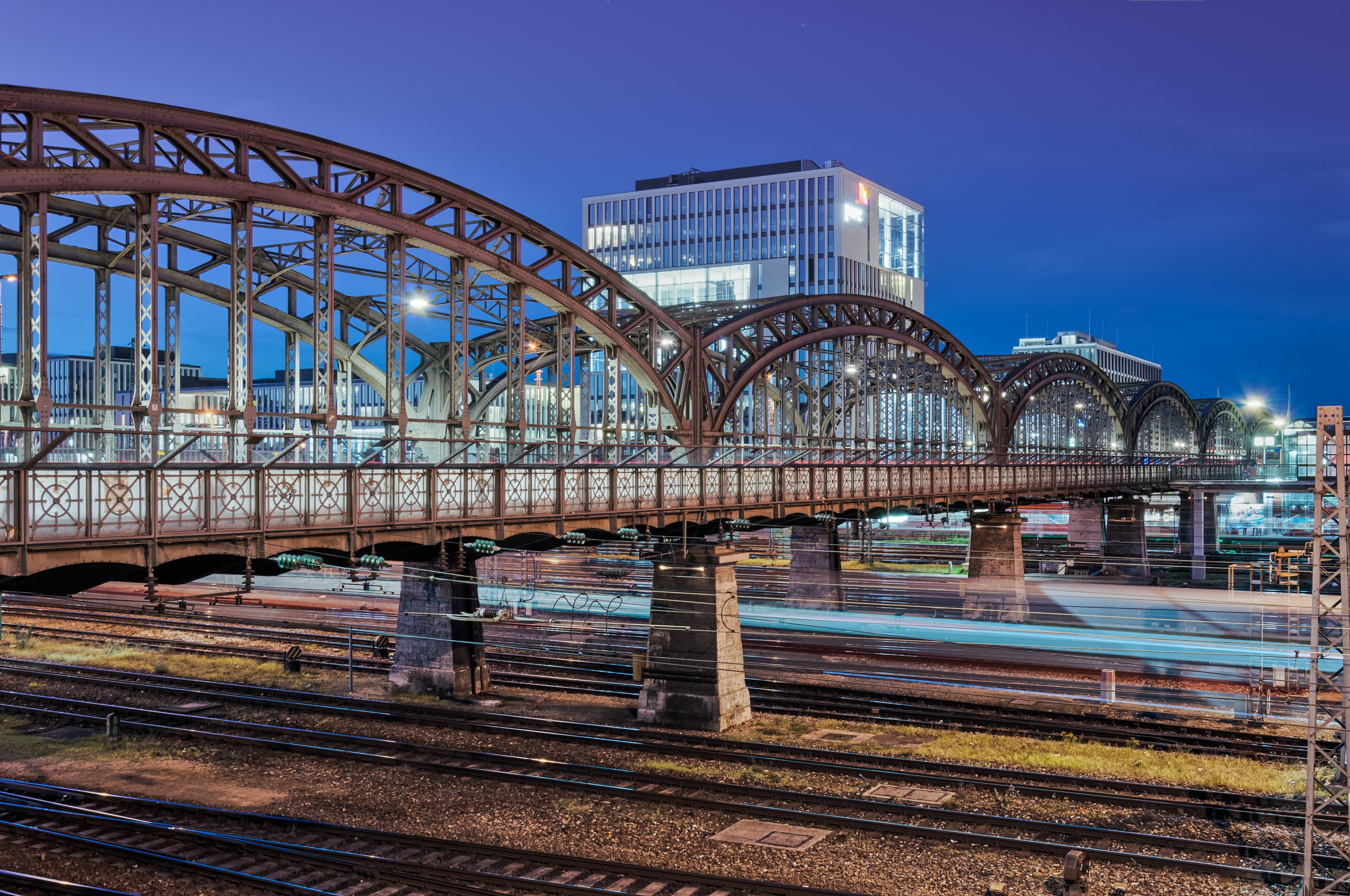
Hackerbrücke

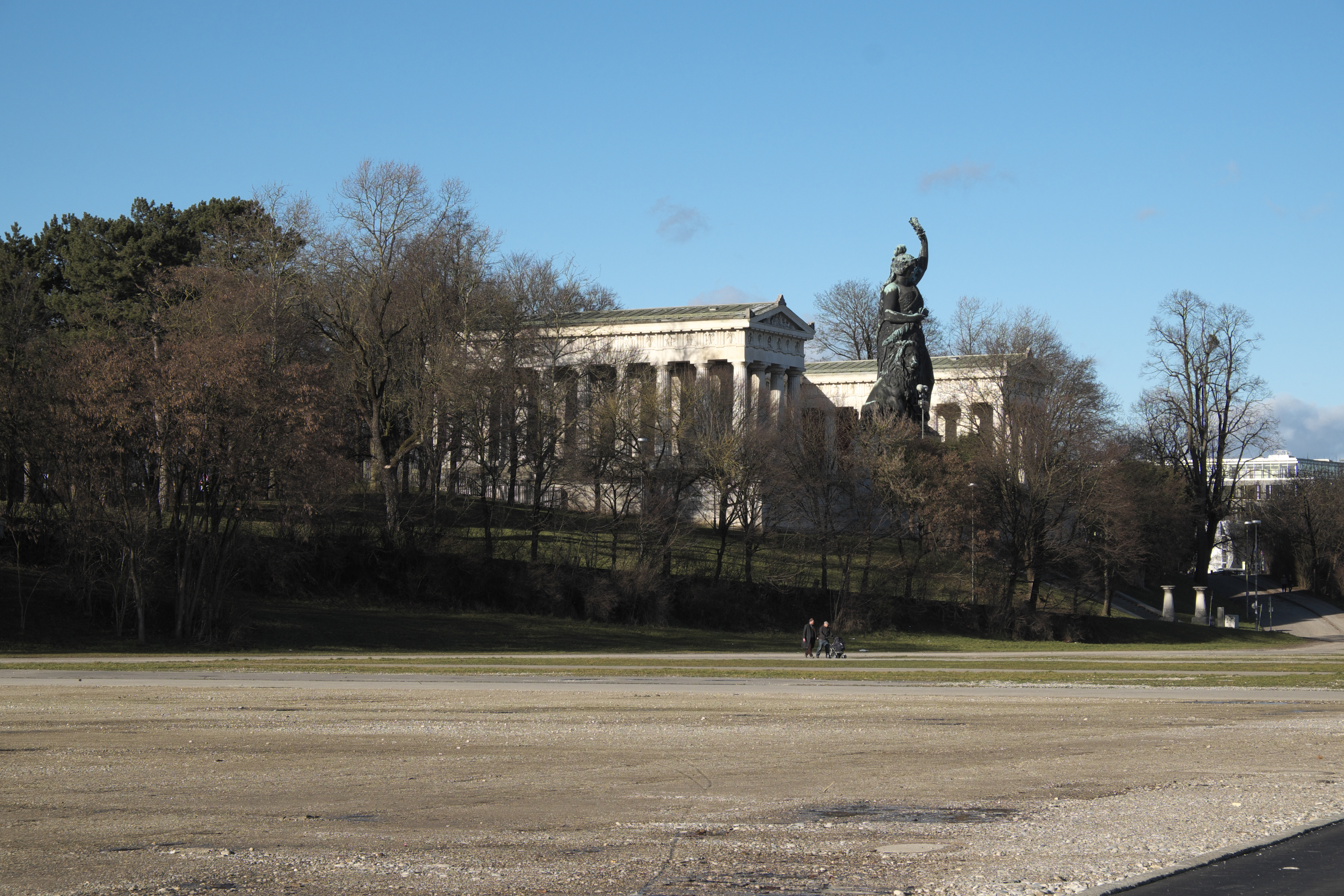
Theresienwiese

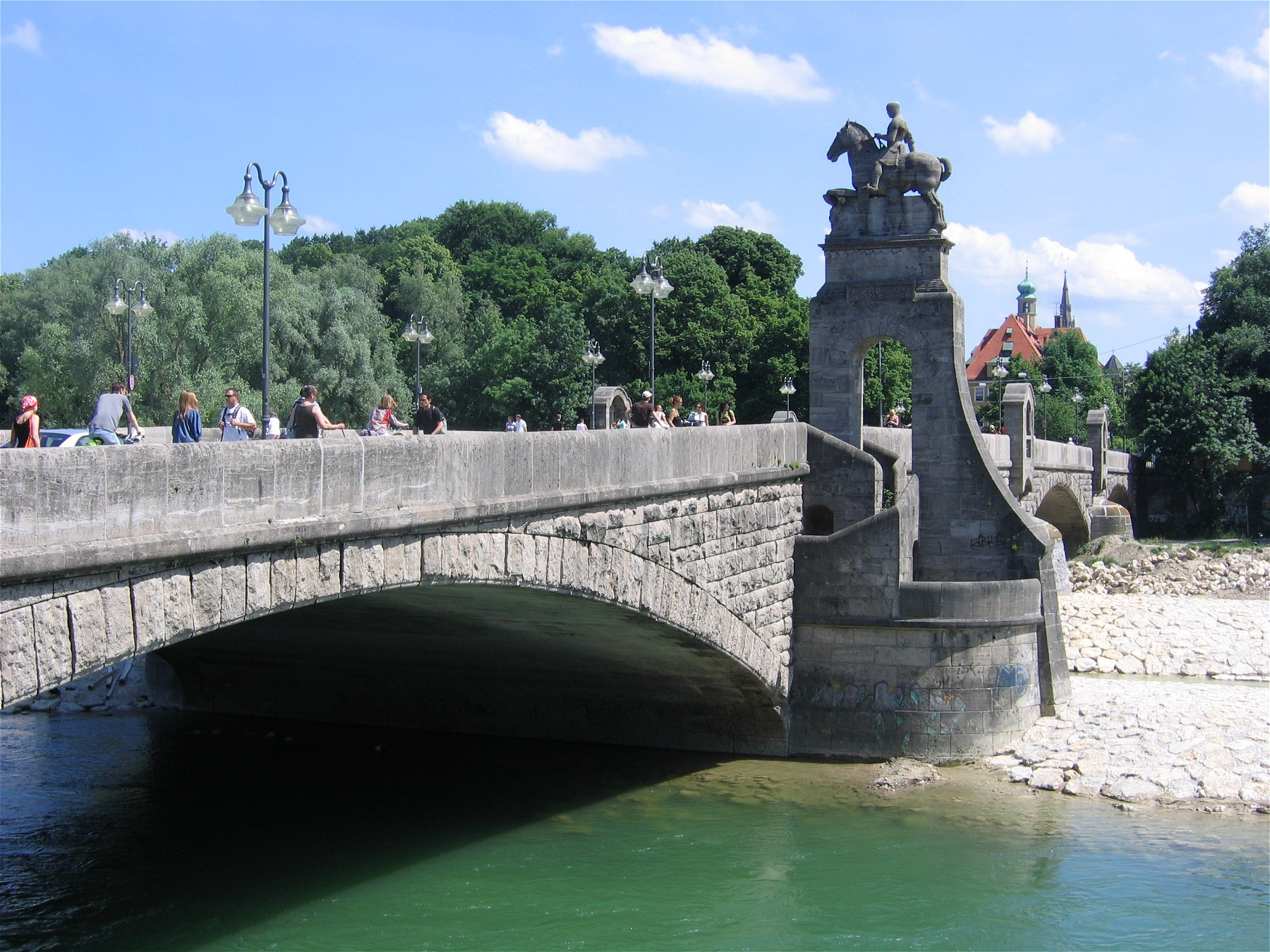
Wittelsbacherbrücke

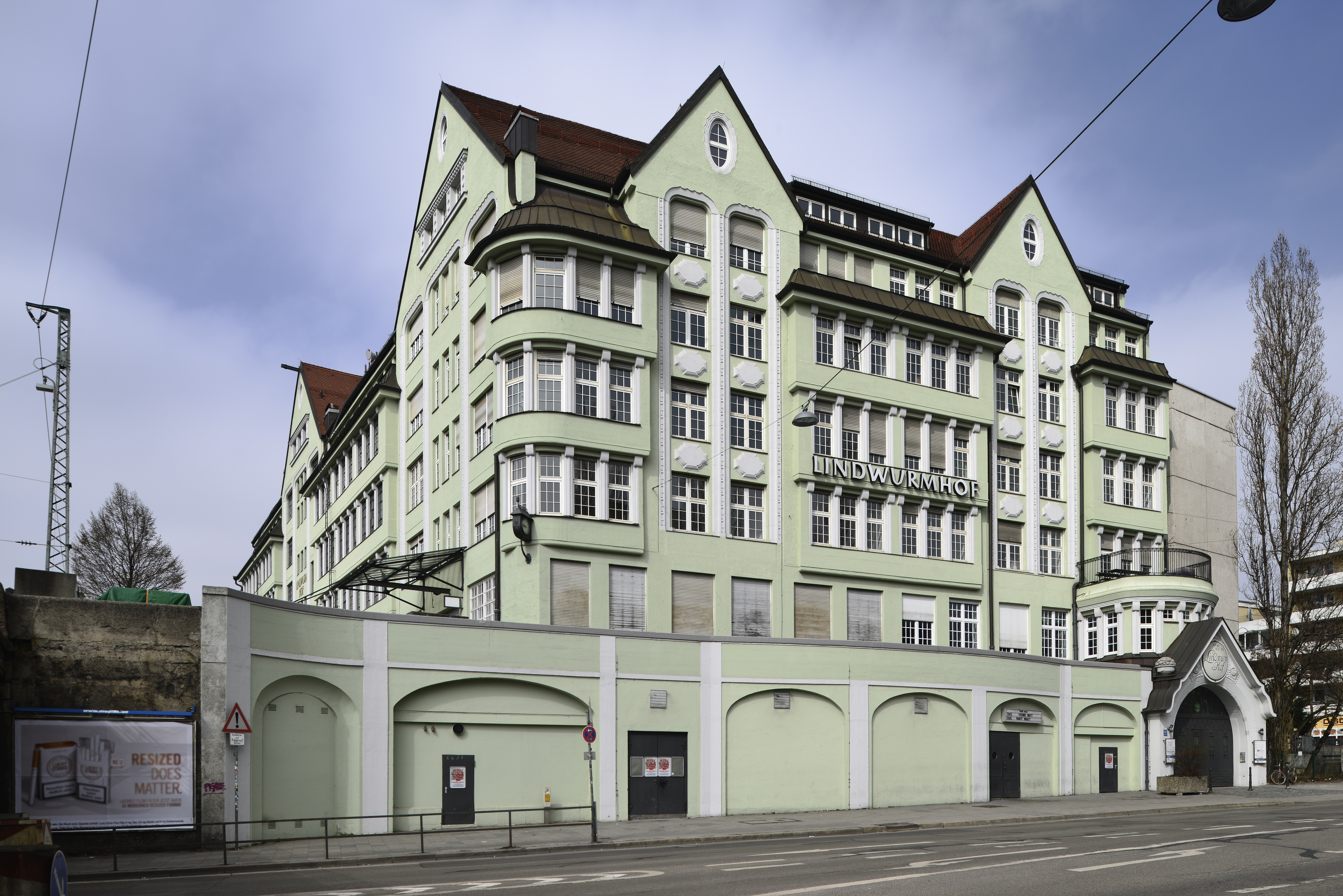
Lindwurmstraße

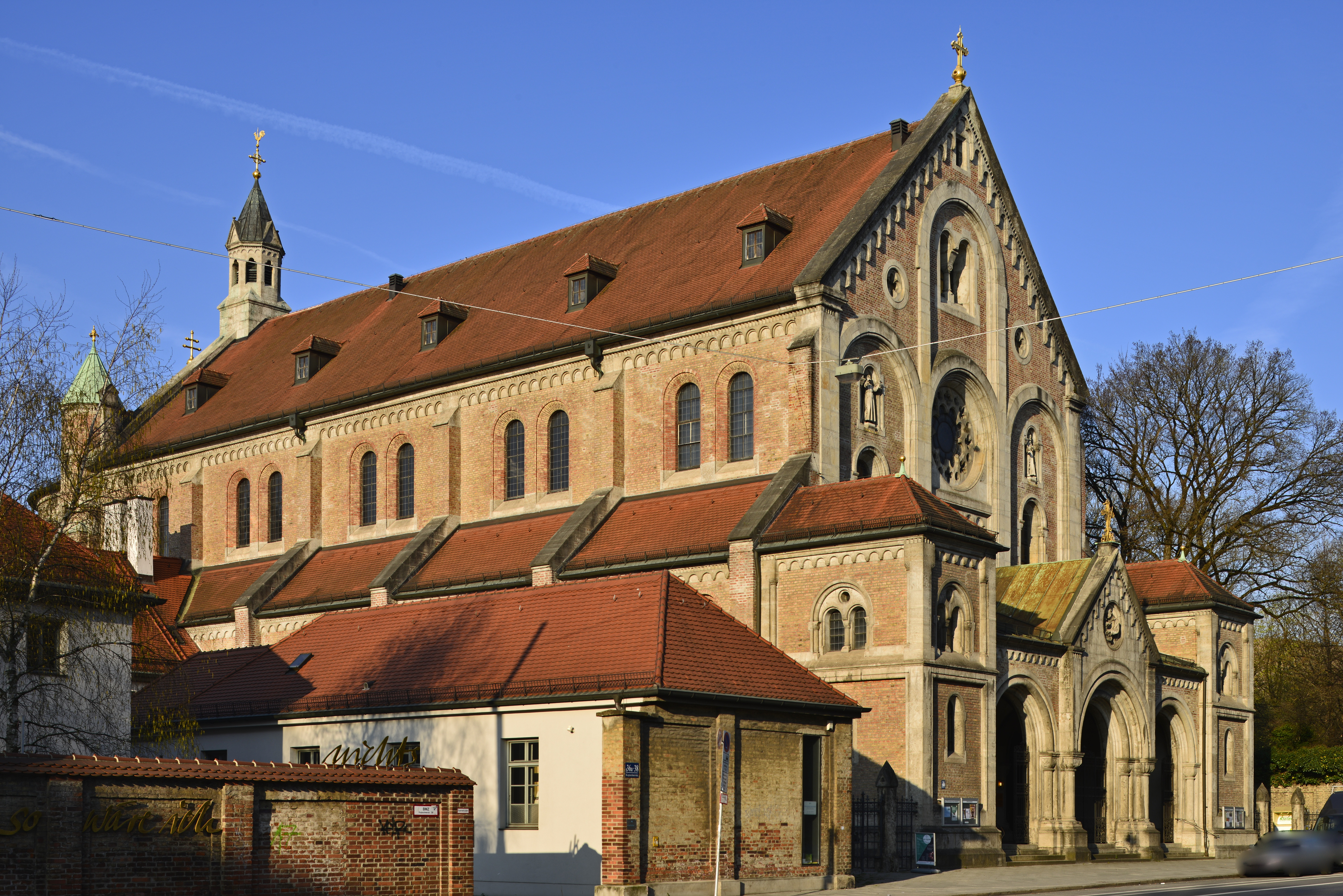
St. Anton

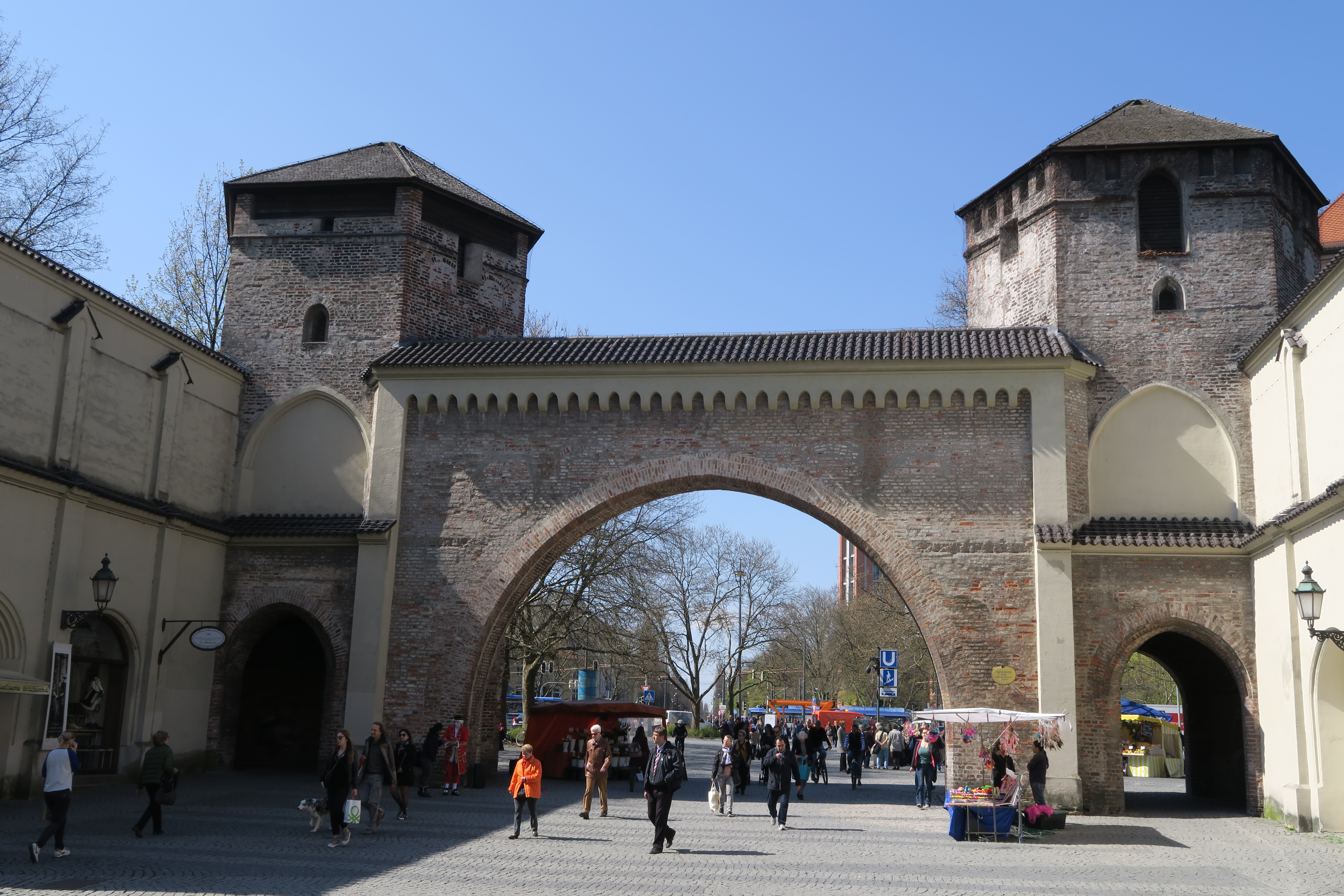
Sendlinger Tor

=== 3 – Maxvorstadt ===
From the Finanzgarten through Schönfeldvorstadt and Ludwigstraße: Finanzgarten, Fotoatelier Elvira, Kaulbachstraße, Academy of Fine Arts, Geschwister-Scholl-Platz, Ludwigstrasse (southern part)

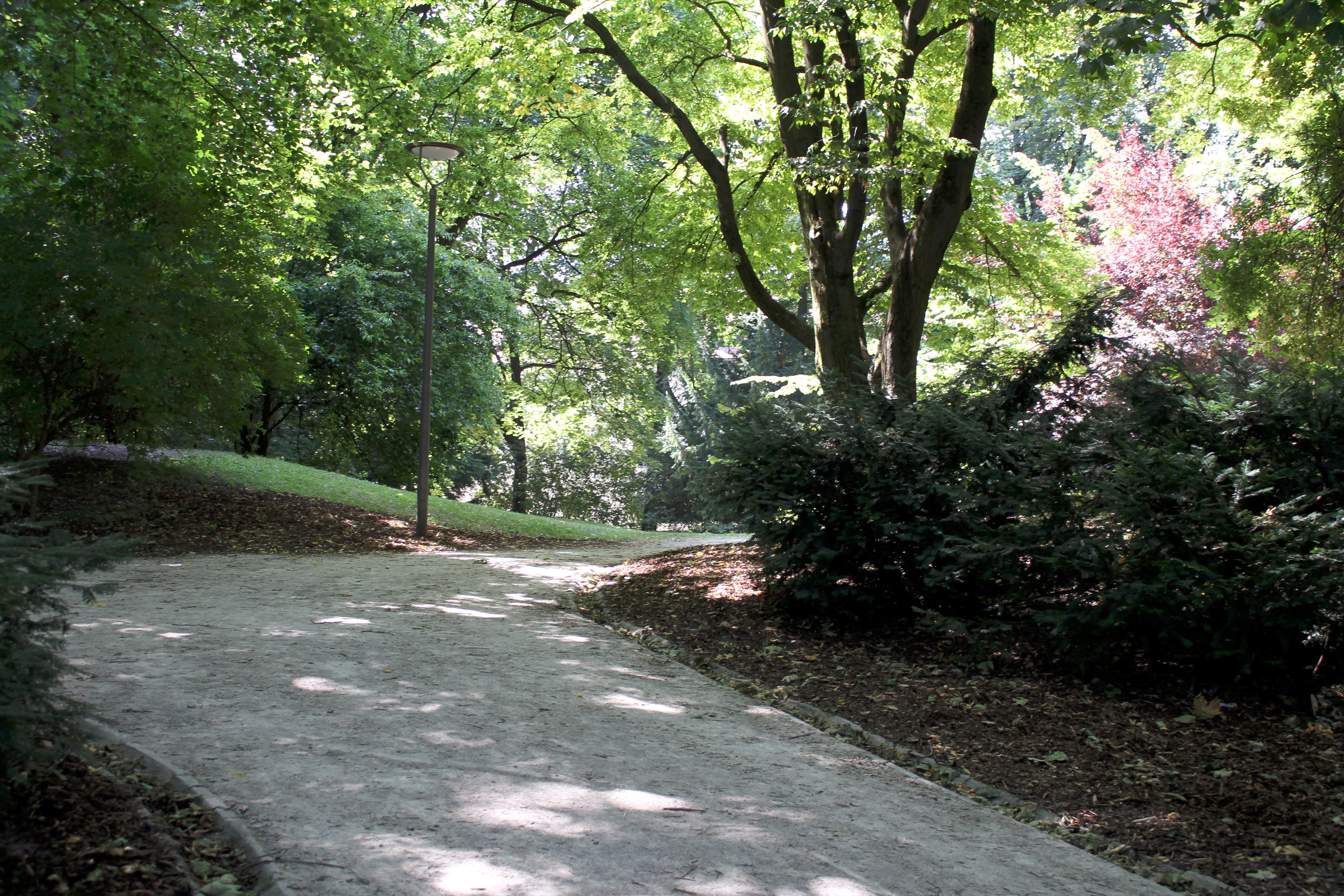
Finanzgarten

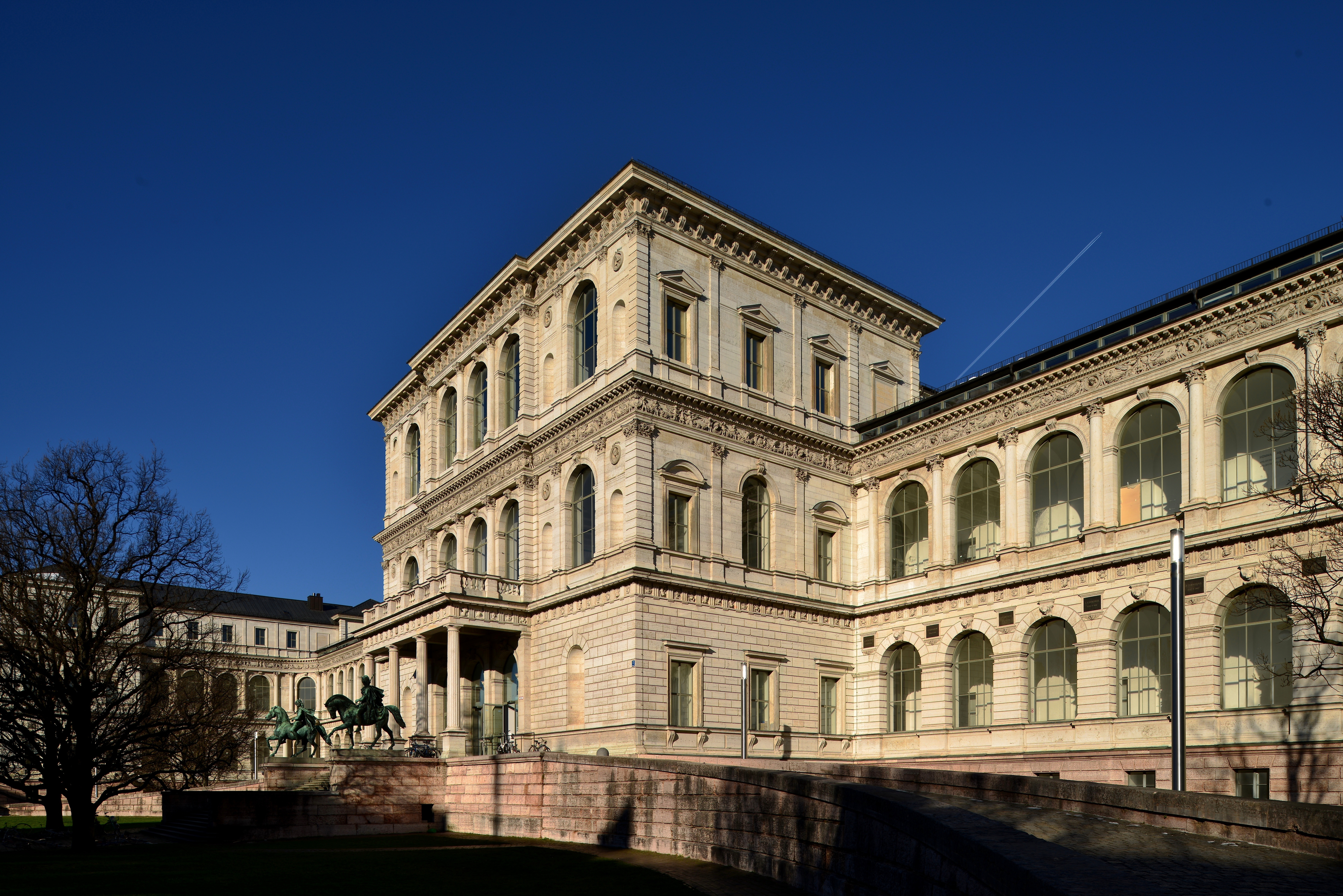
Akademie der Bildenden Künste

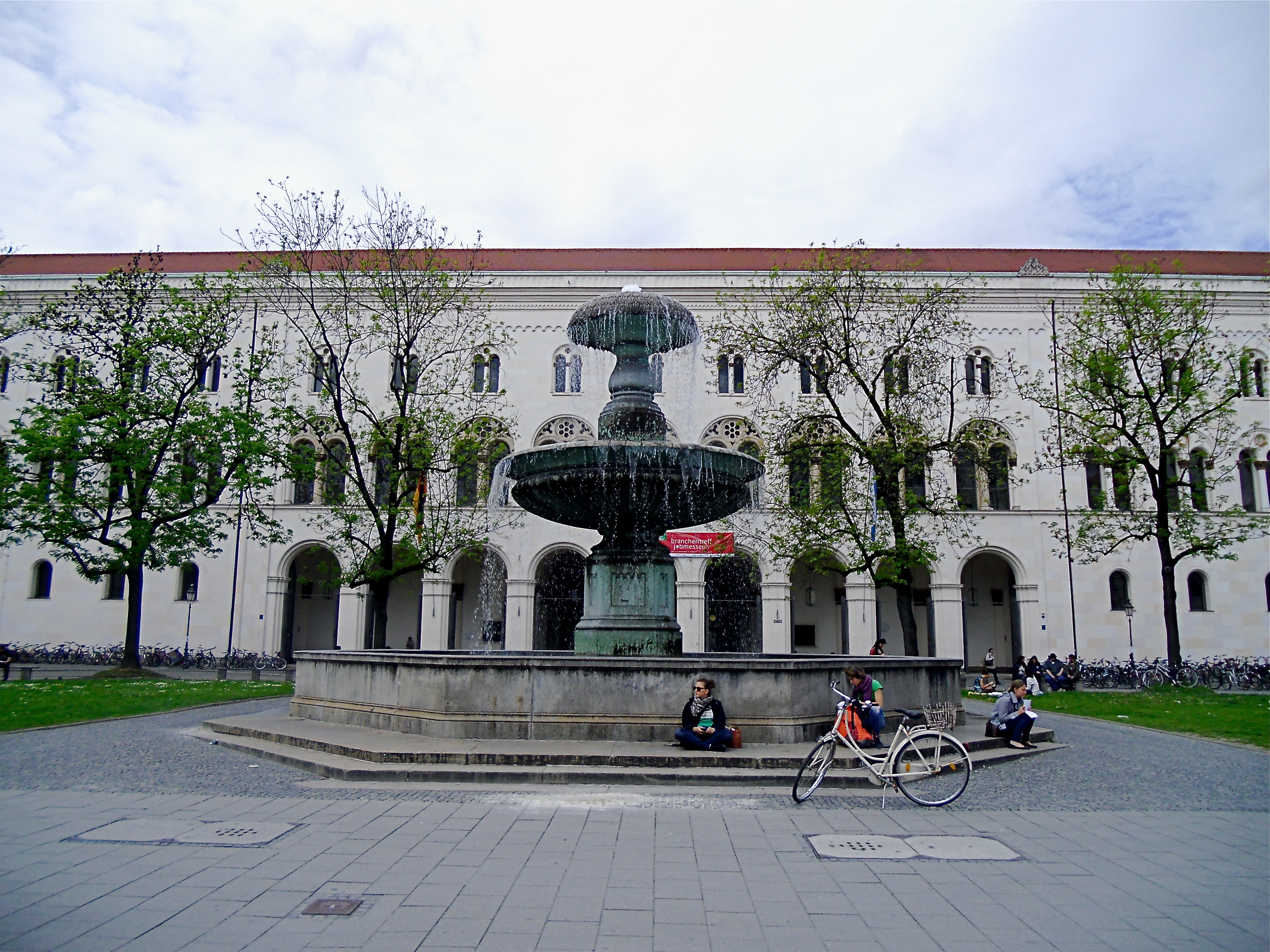
Geschwister-Scholl-Platz

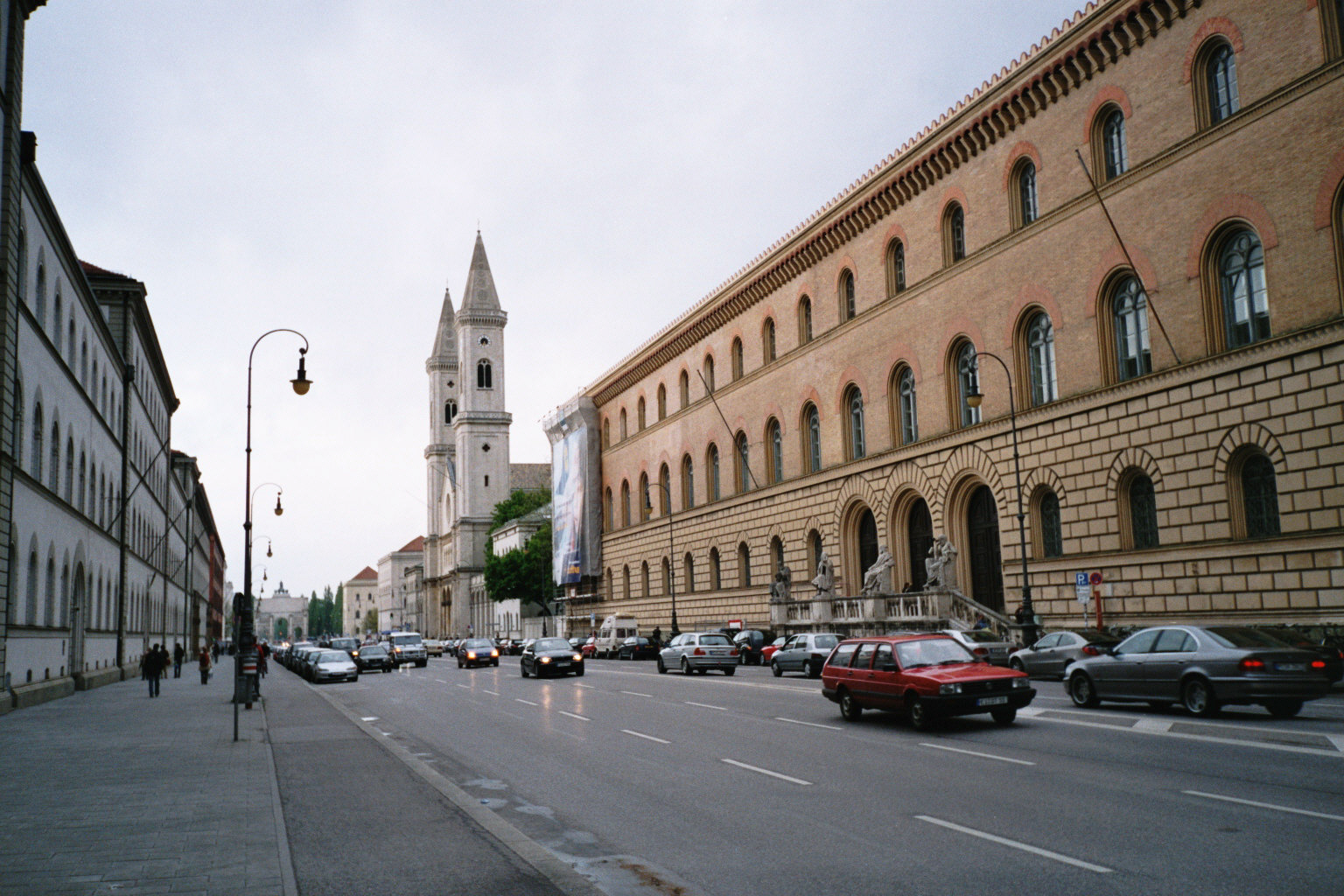
Ludwigstraße

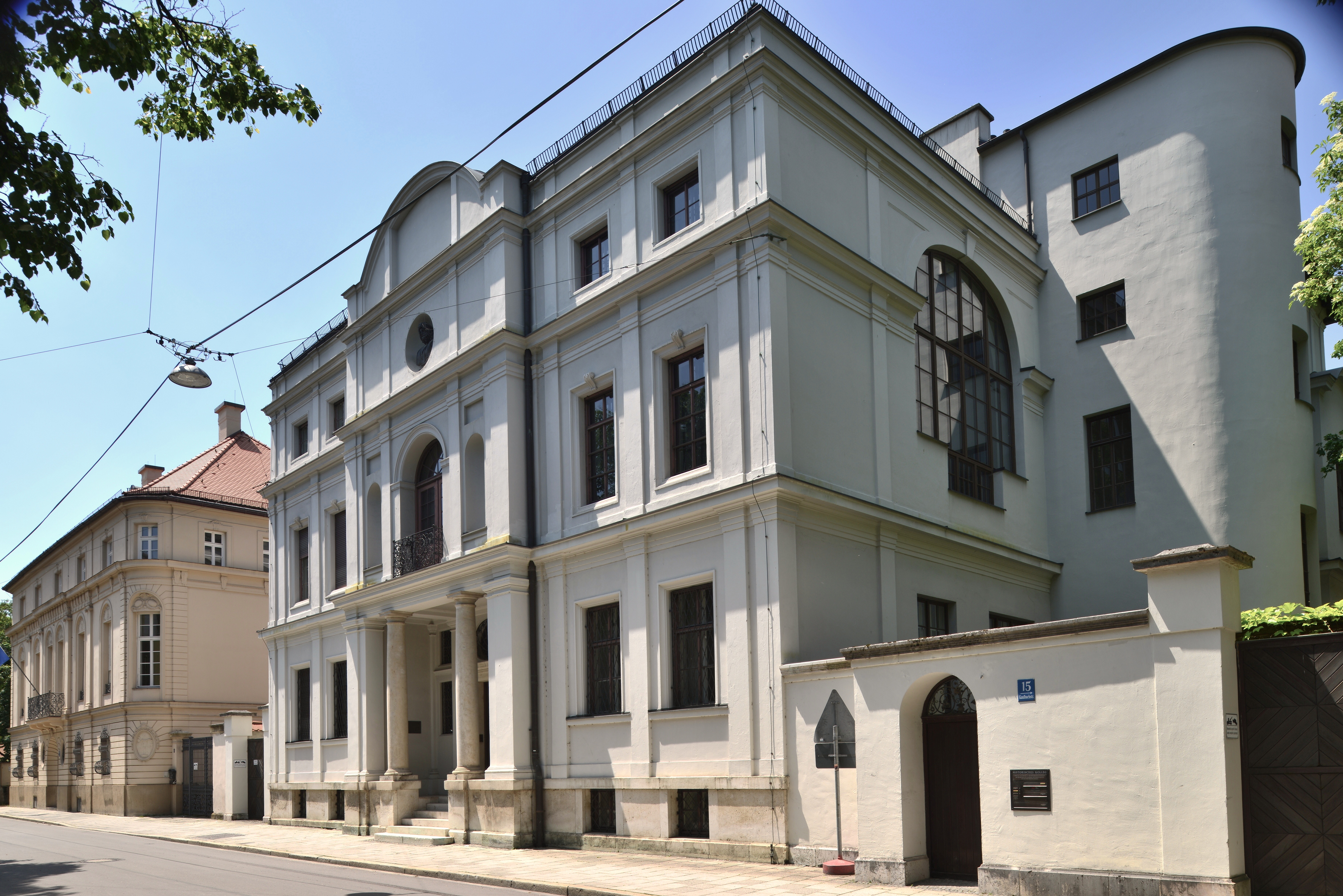
Kaulbachstraße

Around Königsplatz and the Alte Pinakothek museums: Alter Botanischer Garten, St. Bonifaz, Königsplatz, Lenbachhaus, Richard-Wagner-Straße, Hope Bridges Adams Lehmann, Technical University, Oskar Maria Graf, Ellen Ammann, Franz Josef Strauss, Schellingstraße - gateway for the NSDAP to Maxvorstadt, Künstlerkneipe Simplicissimus, Georg-Elser-Platz, Türkenschule, Türkenkaserne, Wittelsbacher Palais, Karolinenplatz

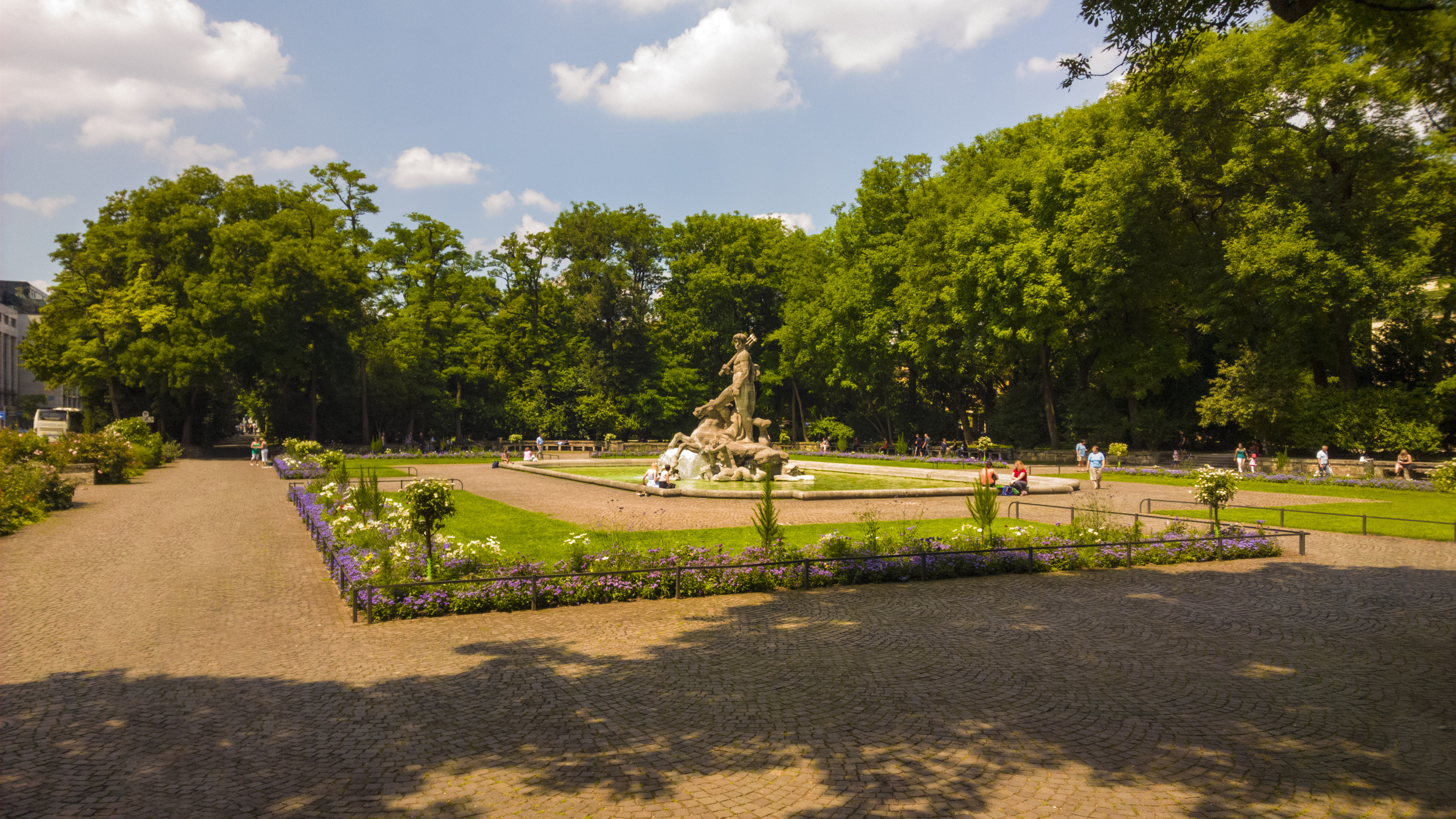
Alter Botanischer Garten

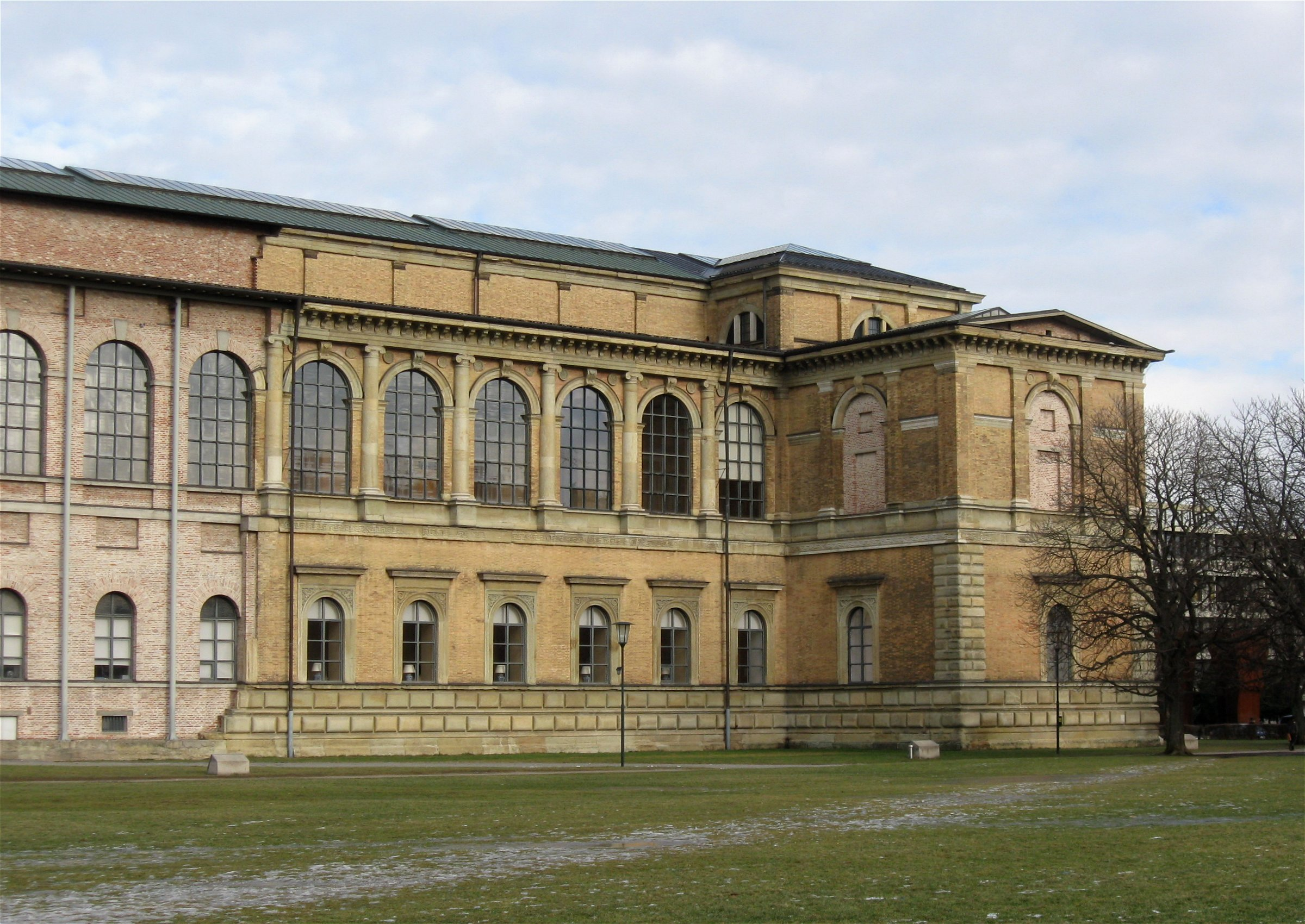
Alte Pinakothek

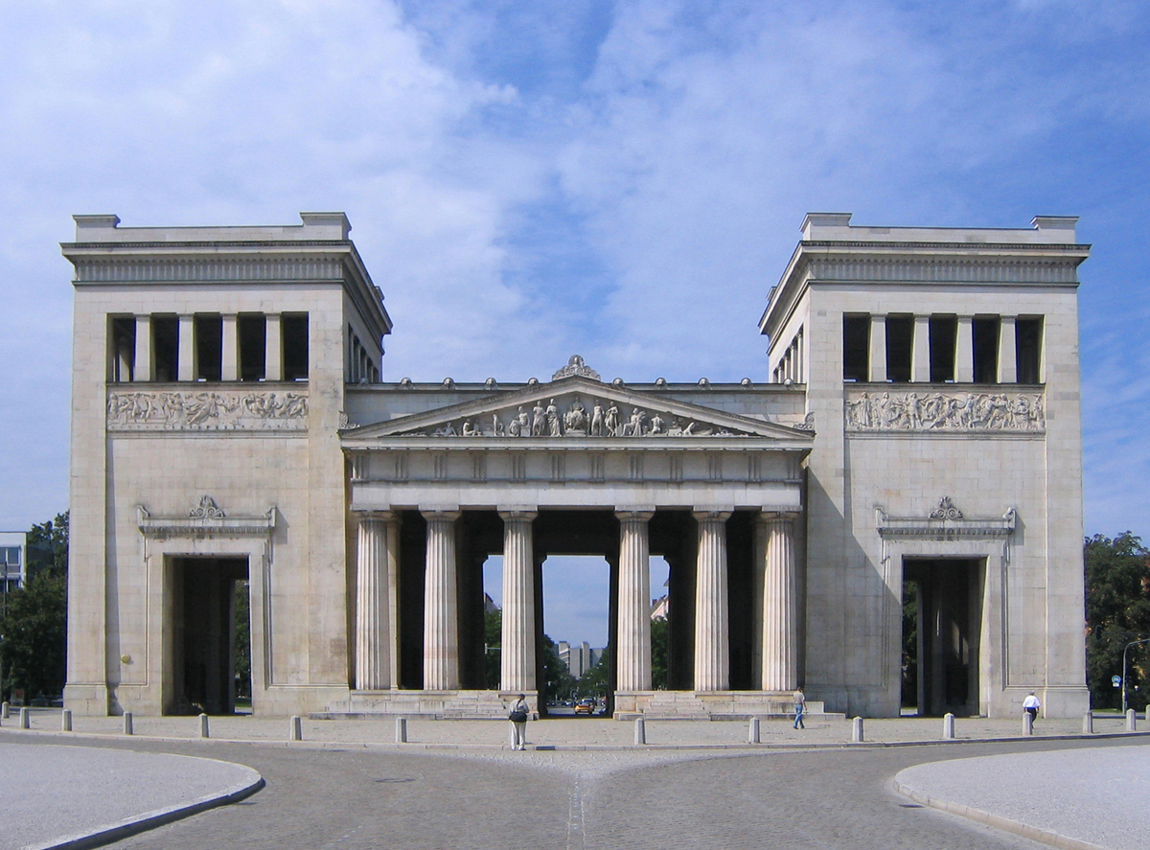
Königsplatz

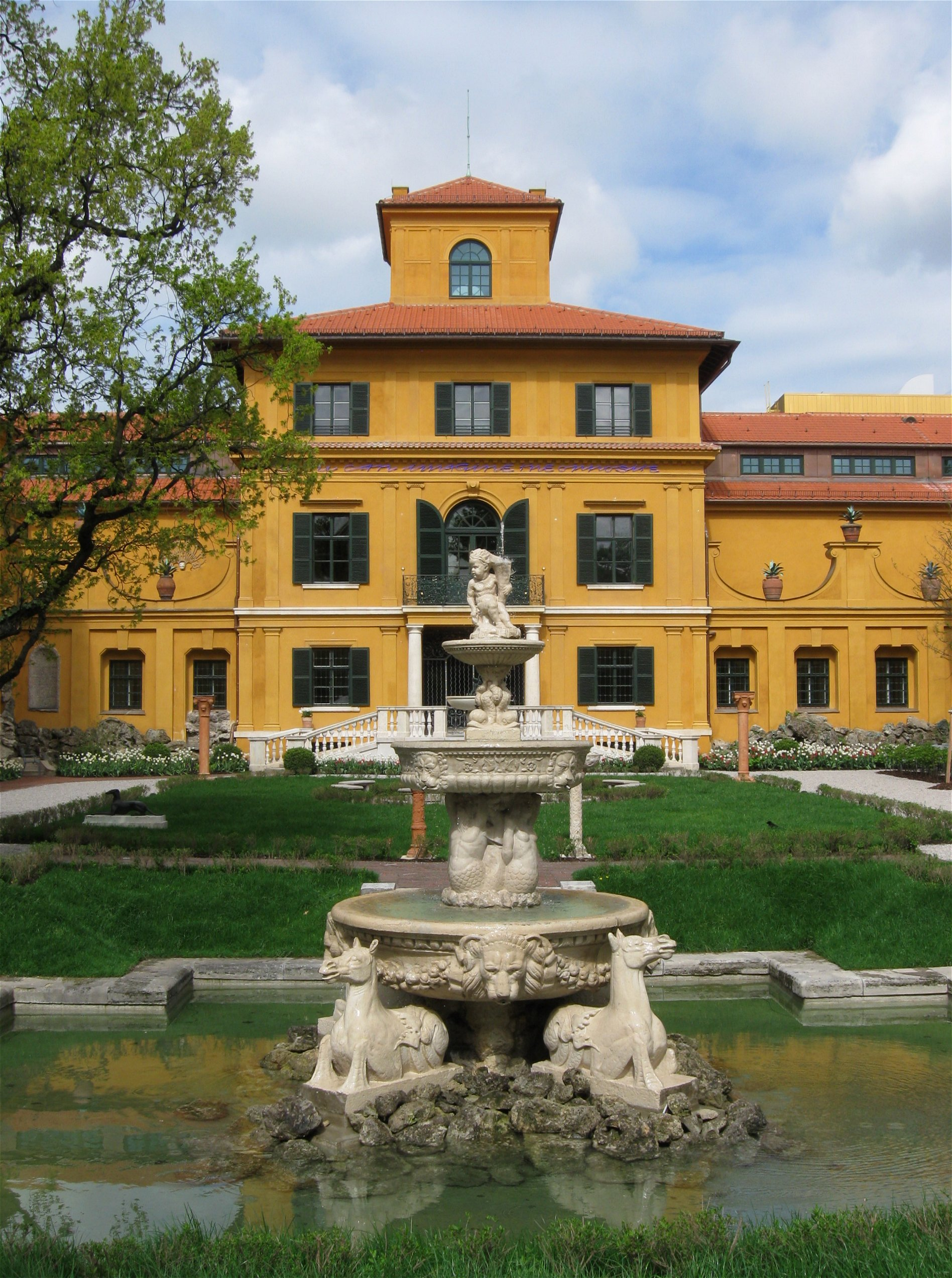
Lenbachhaus

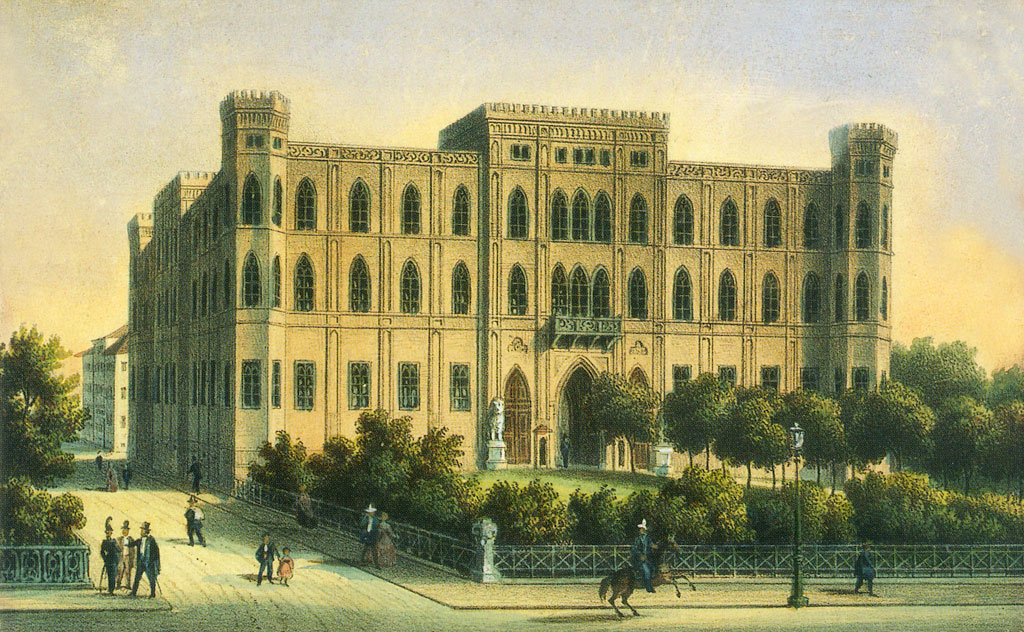
Wittelsbacher Palais

From Marsplatz to the Alter Nördlicher Friedhof: Marsplatz, Alter Nördlicher Friedhof, Circus Krone, Parcel Delivery Office and Chief Post Office, Bayerischer Rundfunk and former Verkehrsministerium (Ministry of Transport), Dachauer Straße (southern part), Stiglmaierplatz, St.-Benno-Viertel, Maßmannpark, Wissenschaftlich-humanitäres Comitee München, St. Joseph

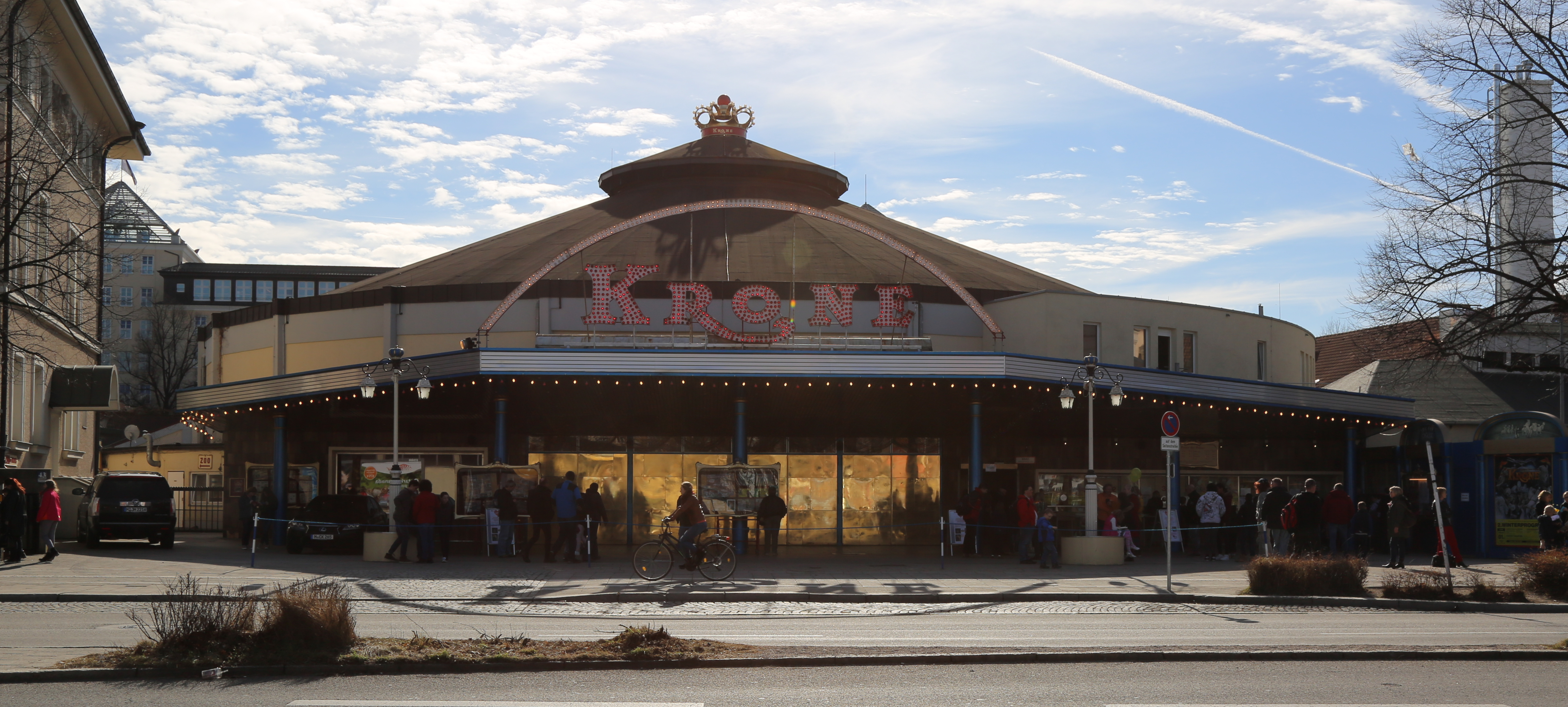
Circus Krone

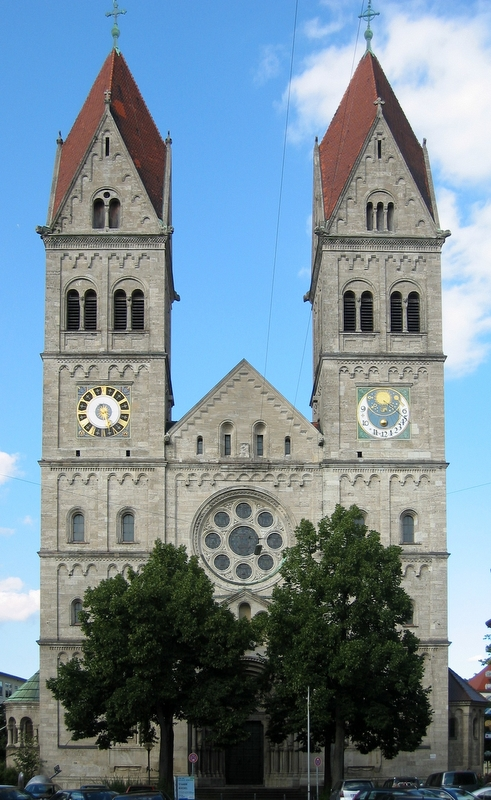
St. Benno

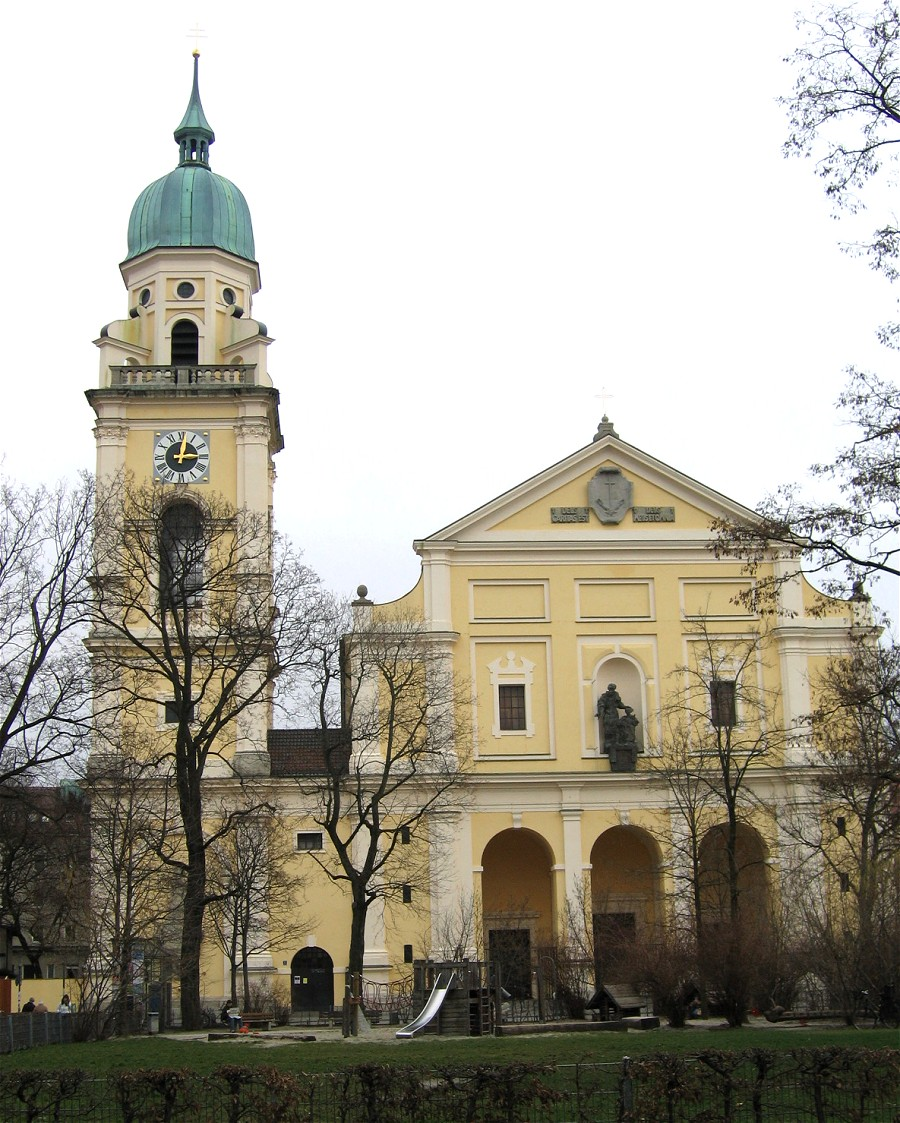
St. Joseph

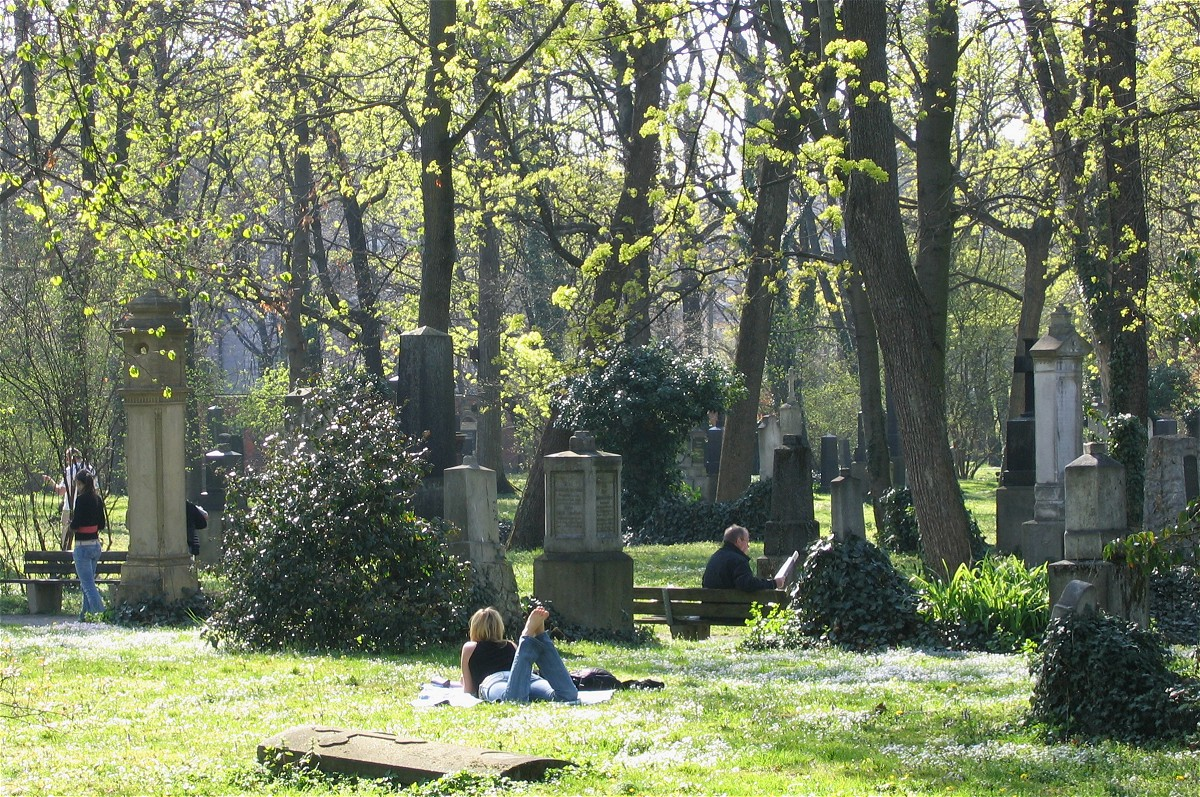
Alter Nördlicher Friedhof

=== 4 – Schwabing West ===
Walk from Kurfürstenplatz to Viktoriastraße: Kurfürstenplatz, Jakob-Klar-Straße, Olga Benário Prestes, Agnespost, Gisela Gymnasium, Elisabethschule, Elisabethplatz and Elisabethmarkt, Schauburg, Frank Wedekind, Luise Kiesselbach, Ainmillerstraße, Wilhelm Hoegner, Carry Brachvogel, Erwin Oehl, Otto Falckenberg

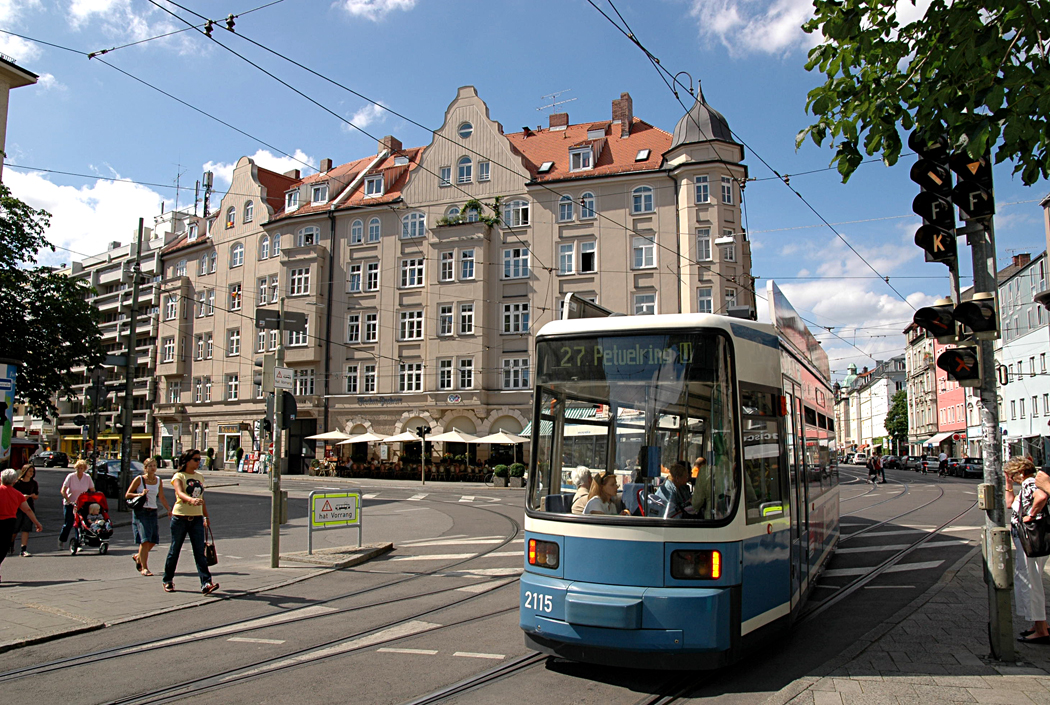
Kurfürstenplatz

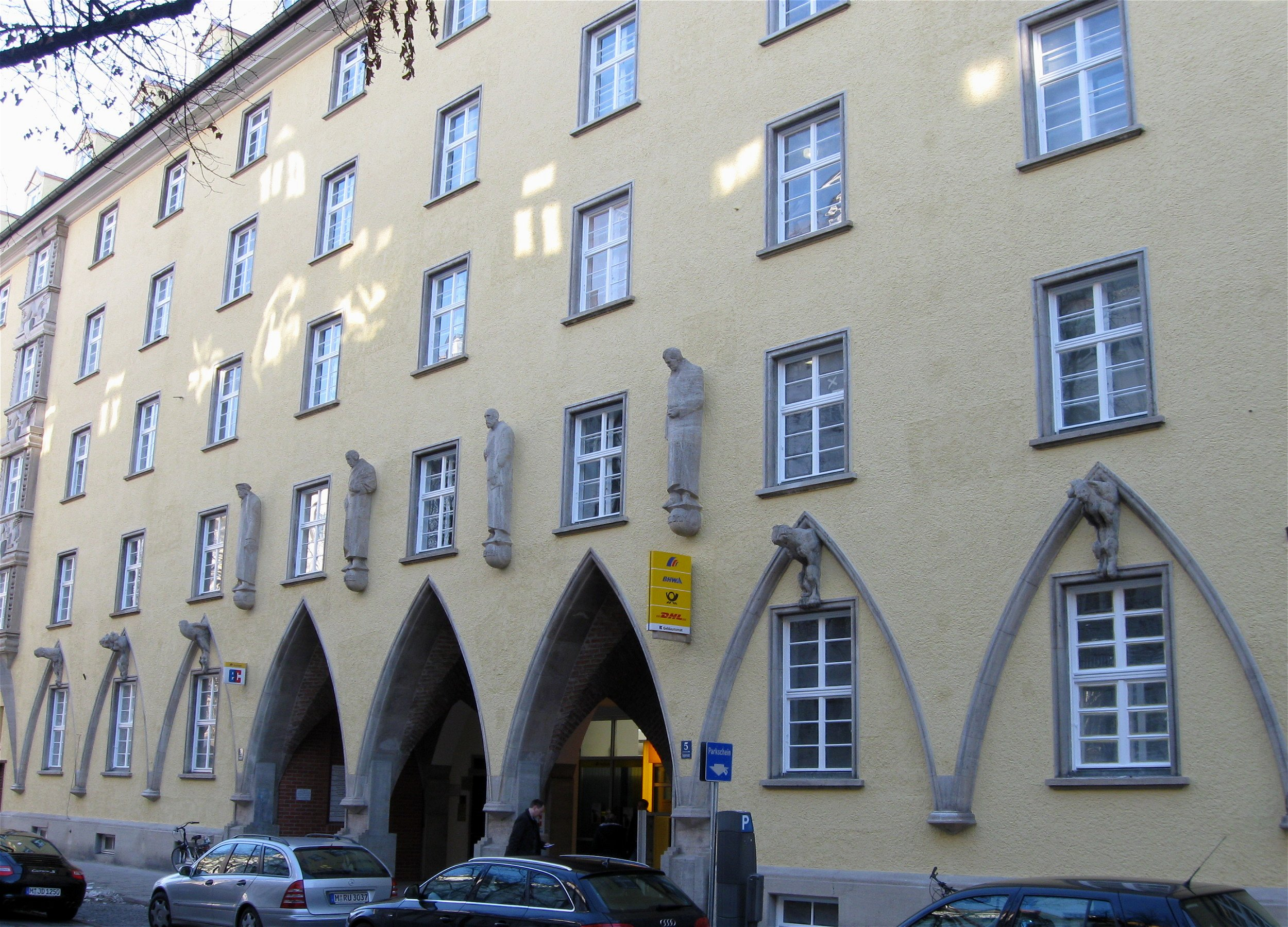
Agnespost

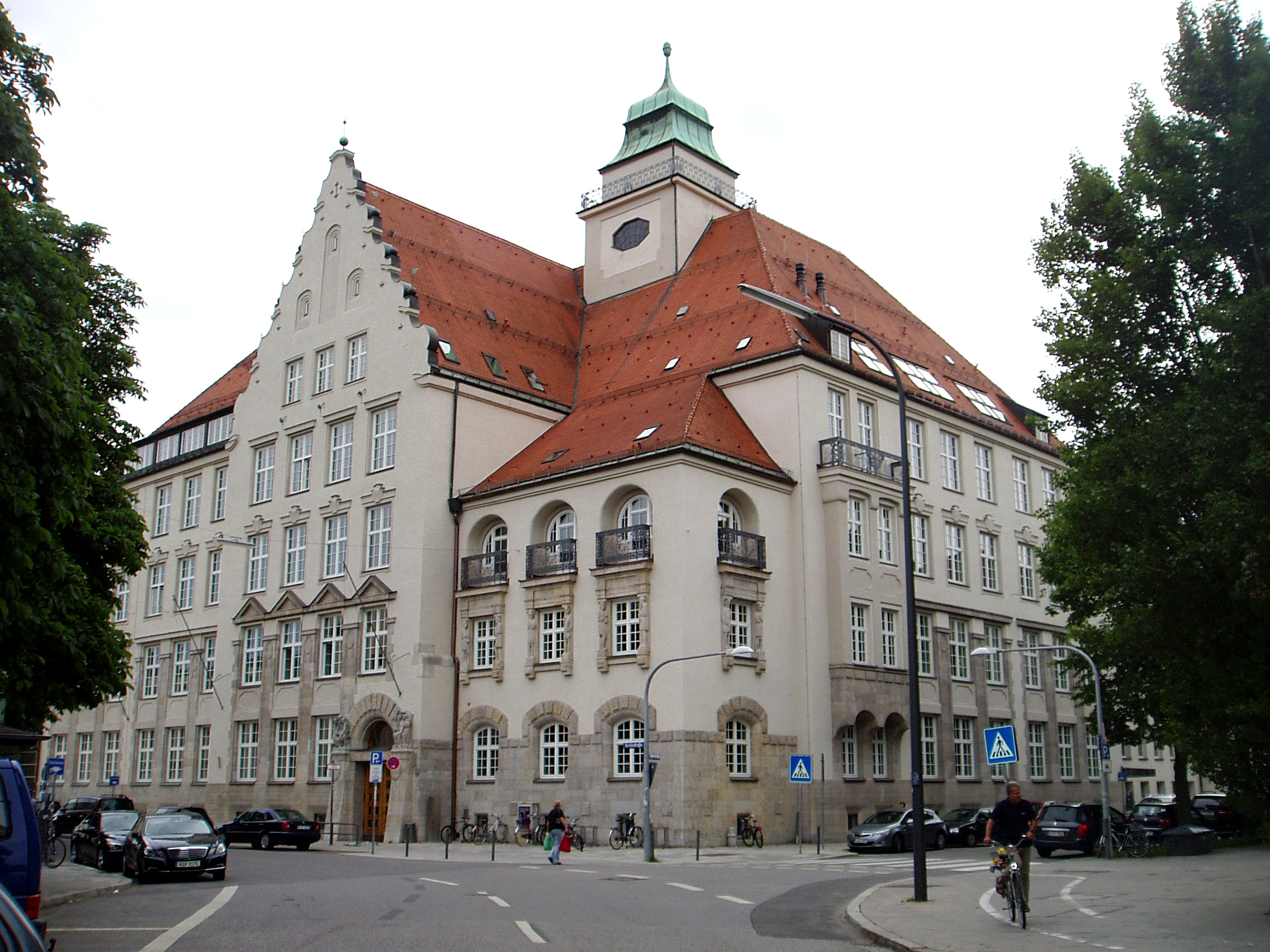
Gisela-Gymnasium

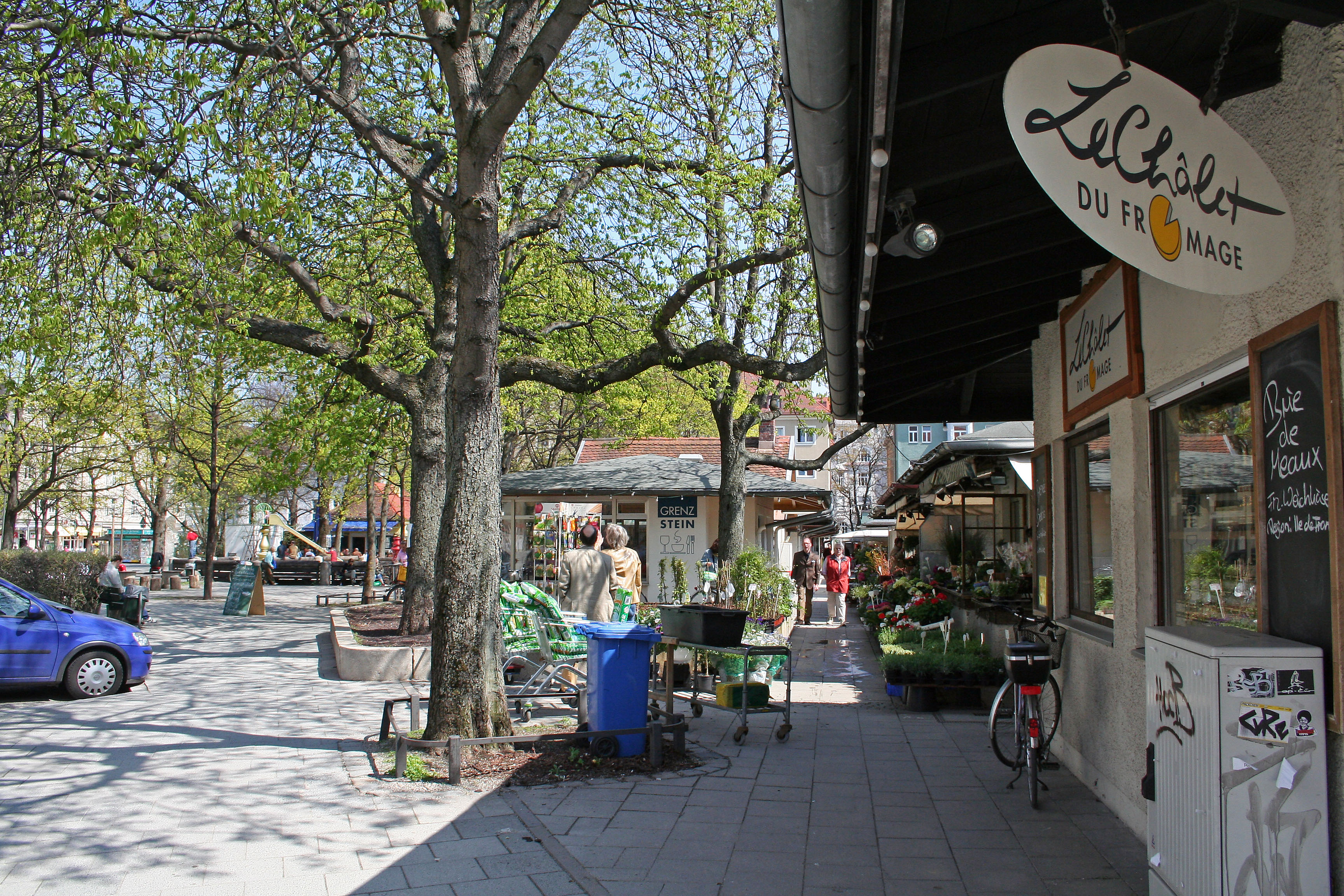
Elisabethmarkt

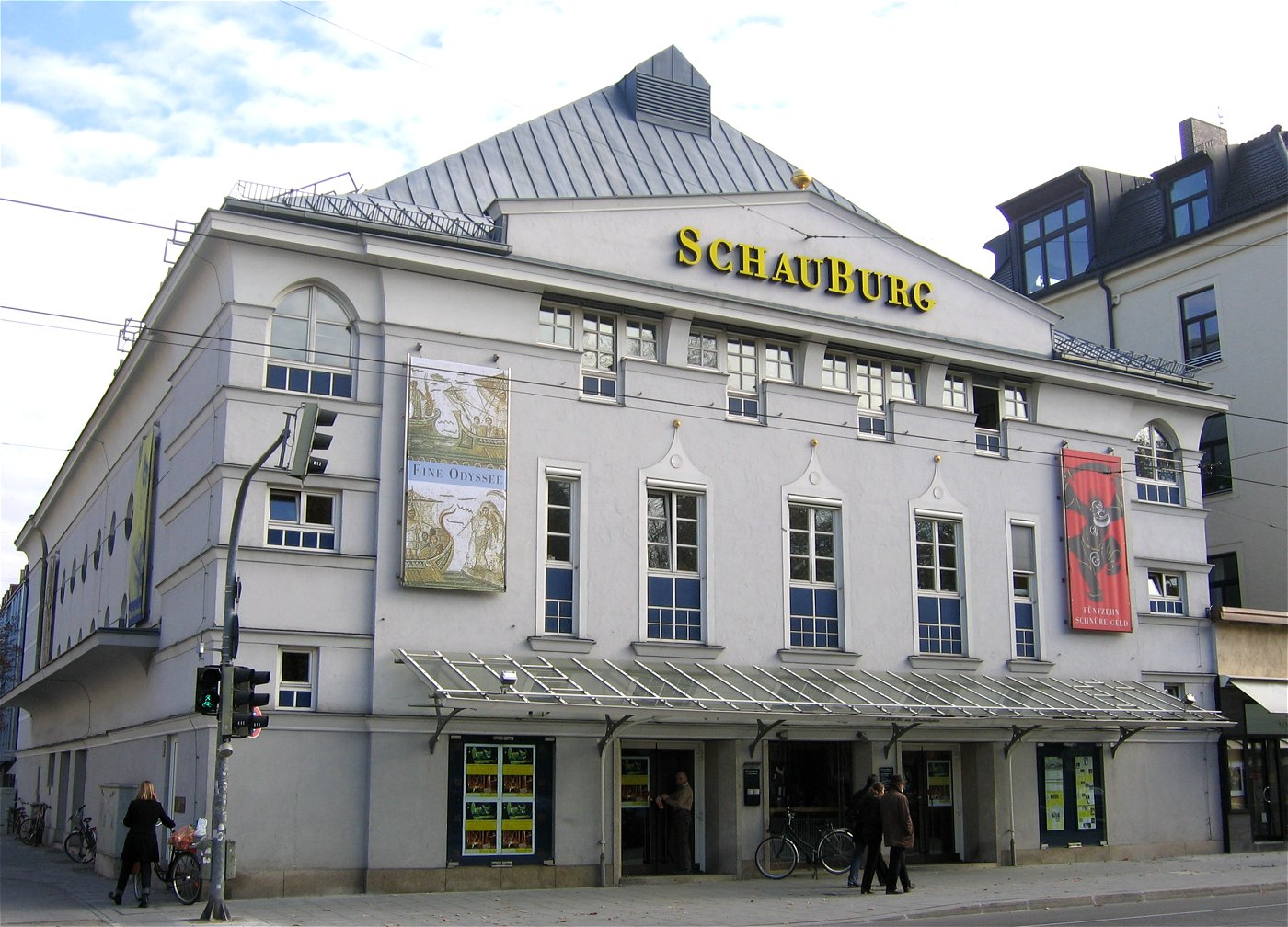
Schauburg

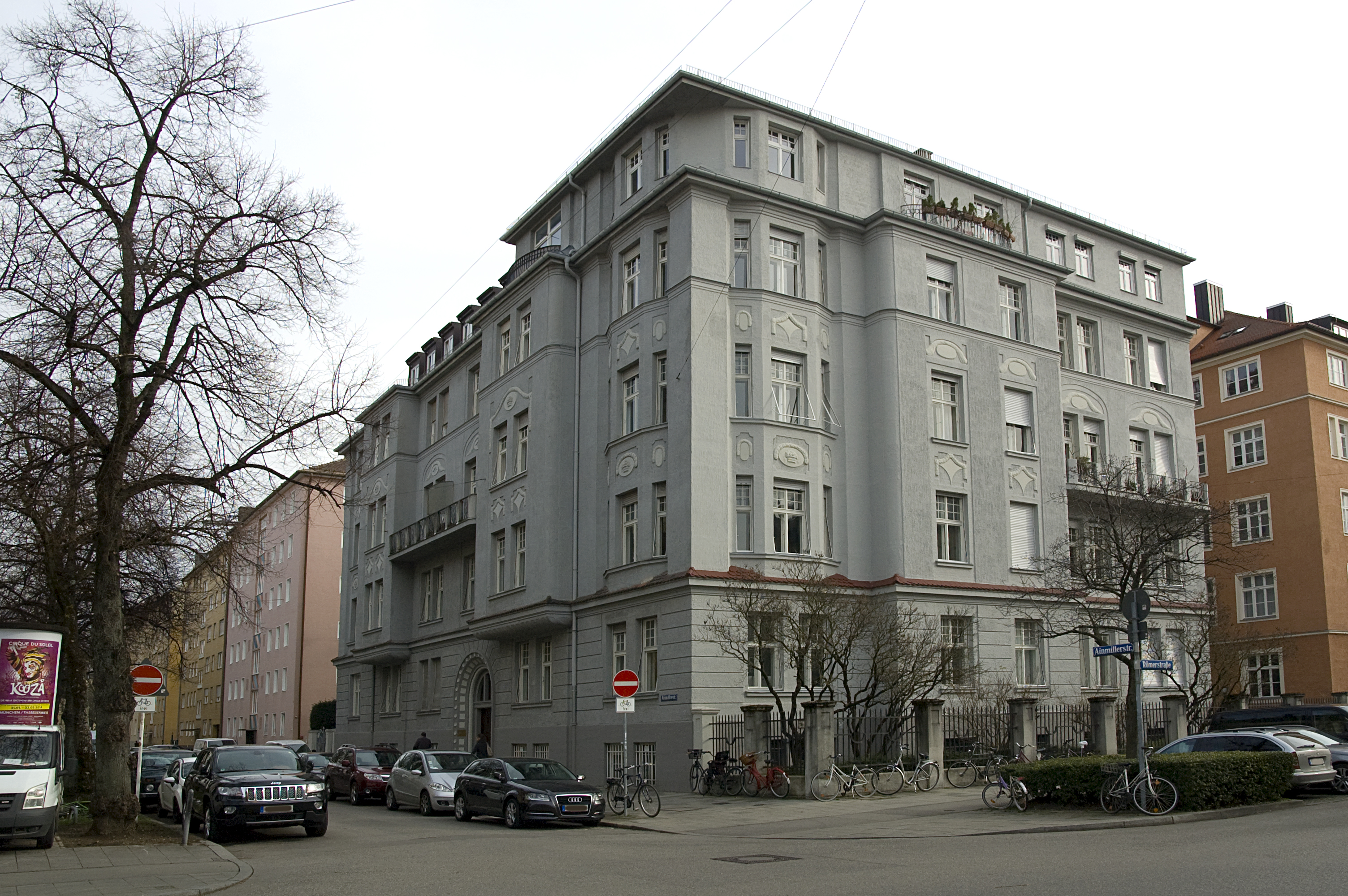
Ainmillerstraße

Walk west of the Hohenzollernplatz: Hermann-Frieb-Realschule, Kreuzkirche, Ackermannbogen, Barbarasiedlung, St. Barbara, Prince Leopold Barracks, Stadtarchiv München, Nordbad

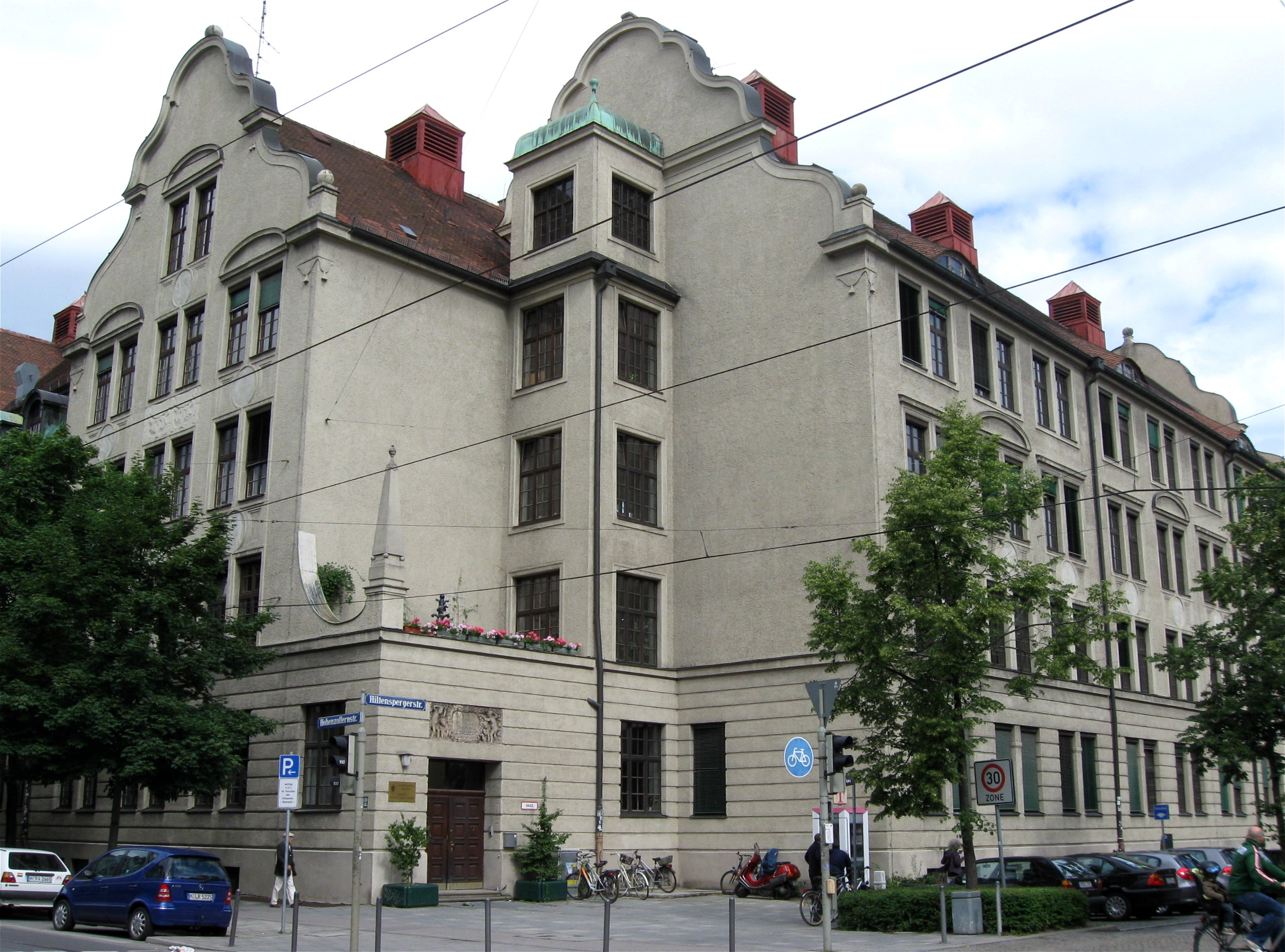
Hermann-Frieb-Realschule

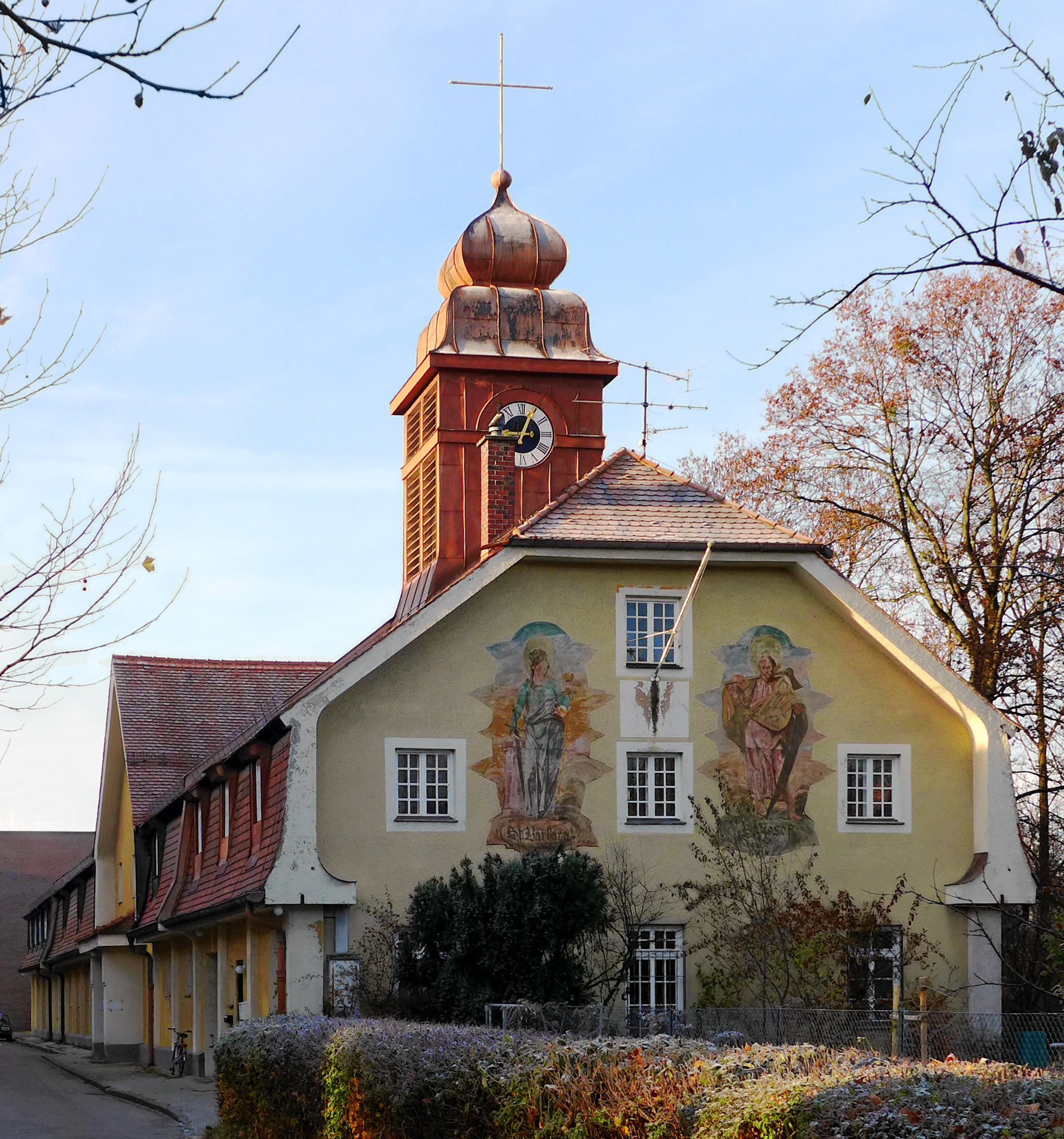
St. Barbara

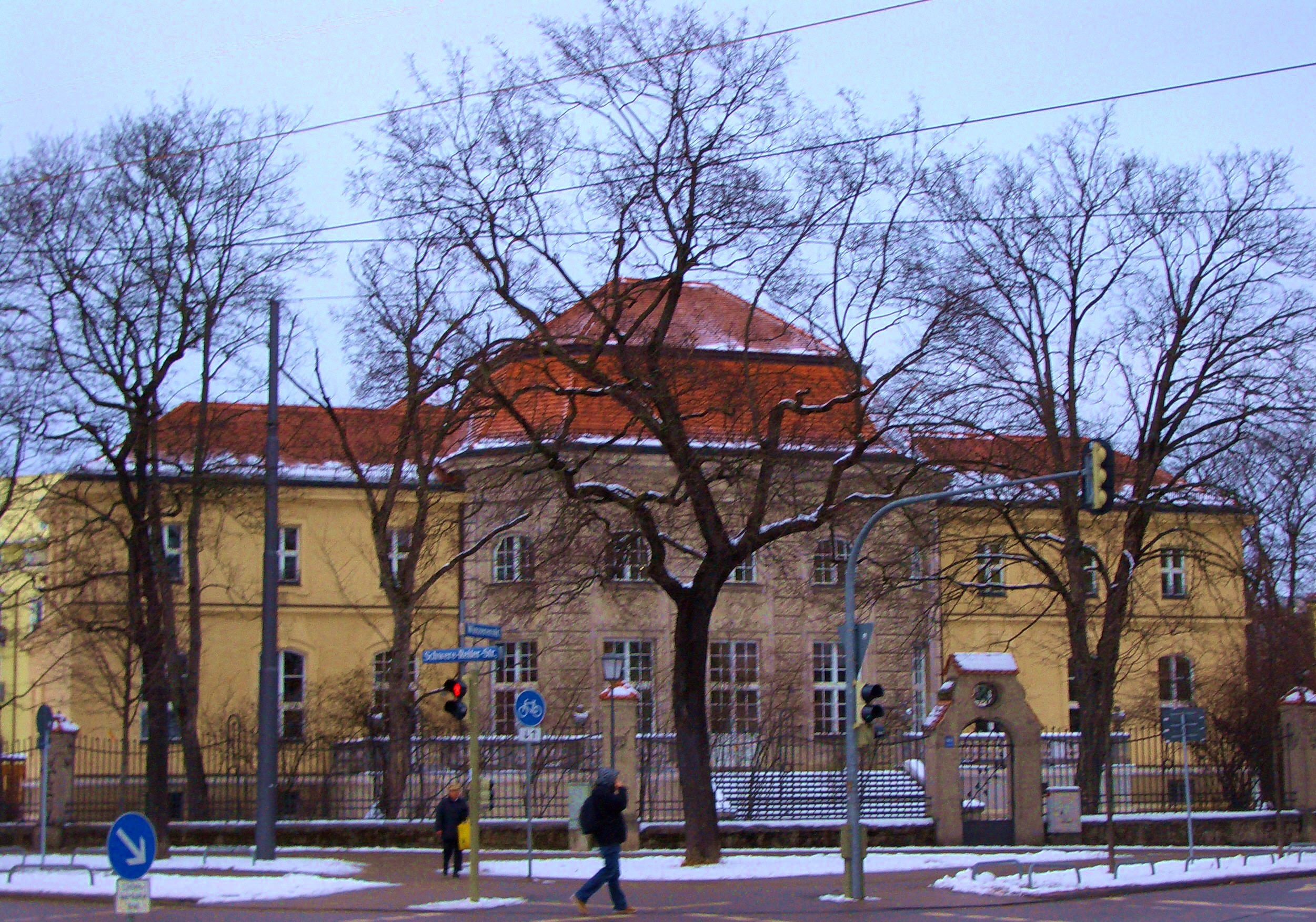
Prinz-Leopold-Kaserne

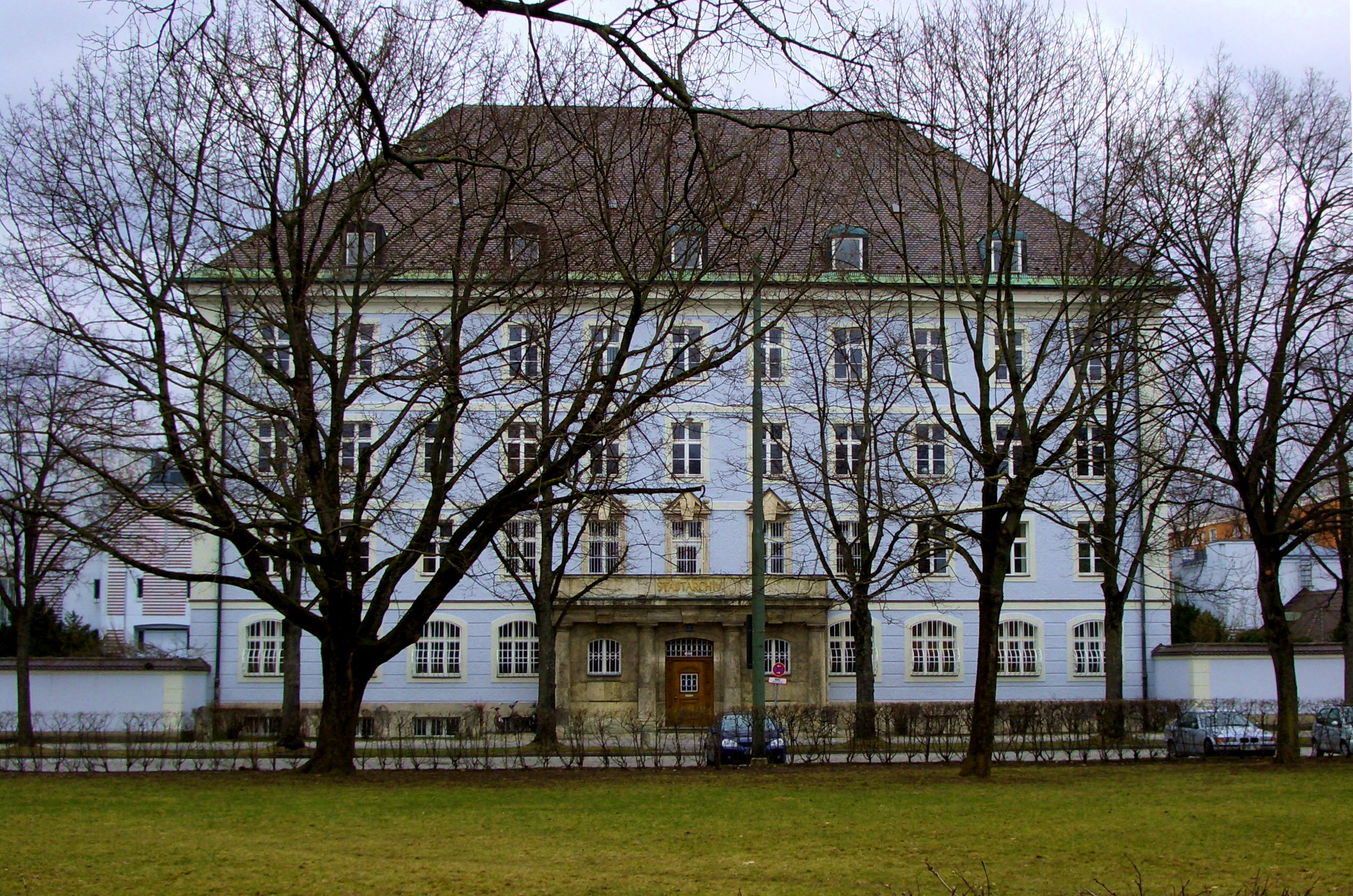
Stadtarchiv München

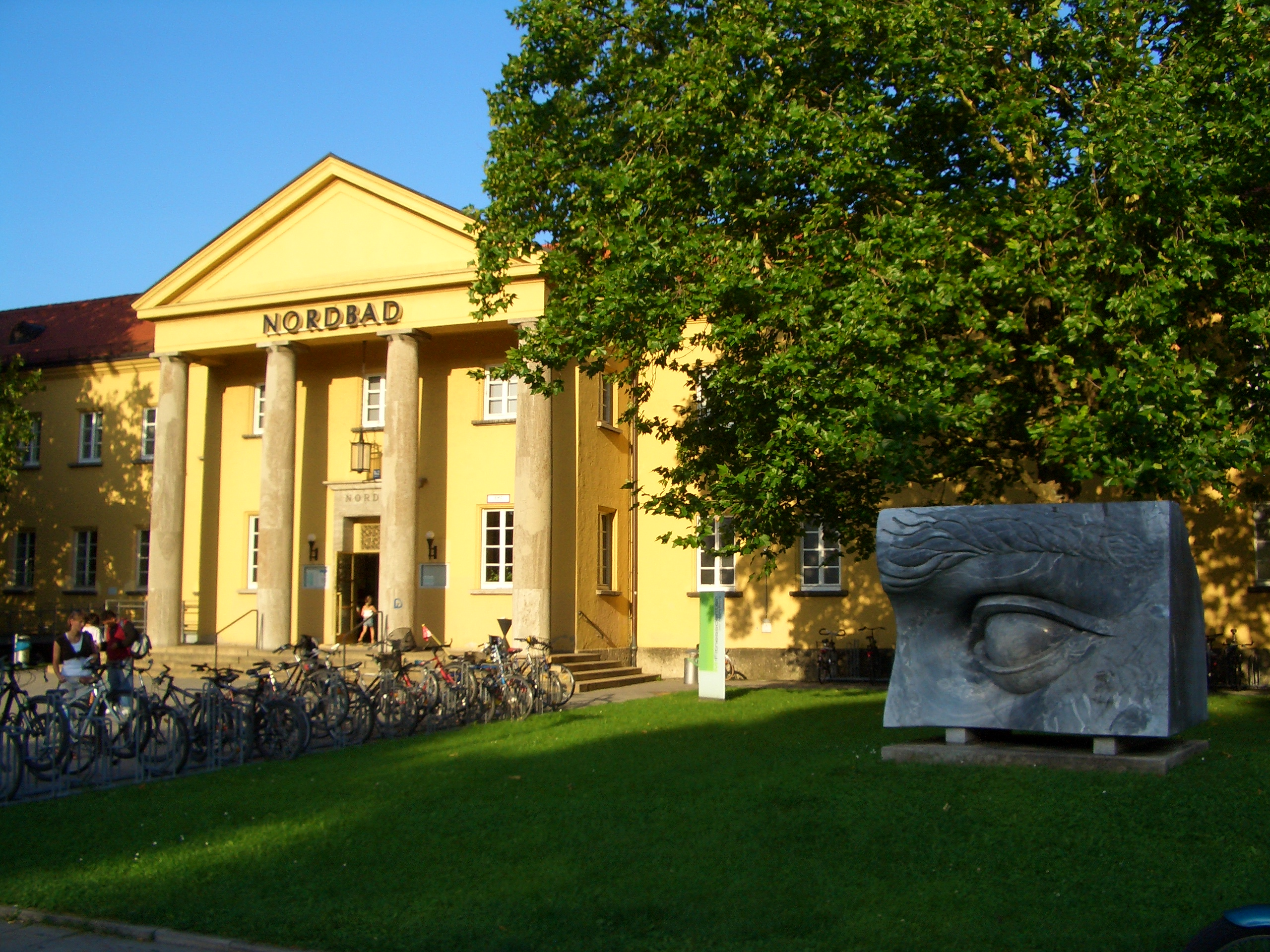
Nordbad

Walk from Luitpoldpark via Petuelpark to Schwabing Hospital: St. Sebastian, Luitpoldpark, Petuelpark, Stiftung Pfennigparade, Max Planck Institute for Psychiatry, Schwabinger Krankenhaus

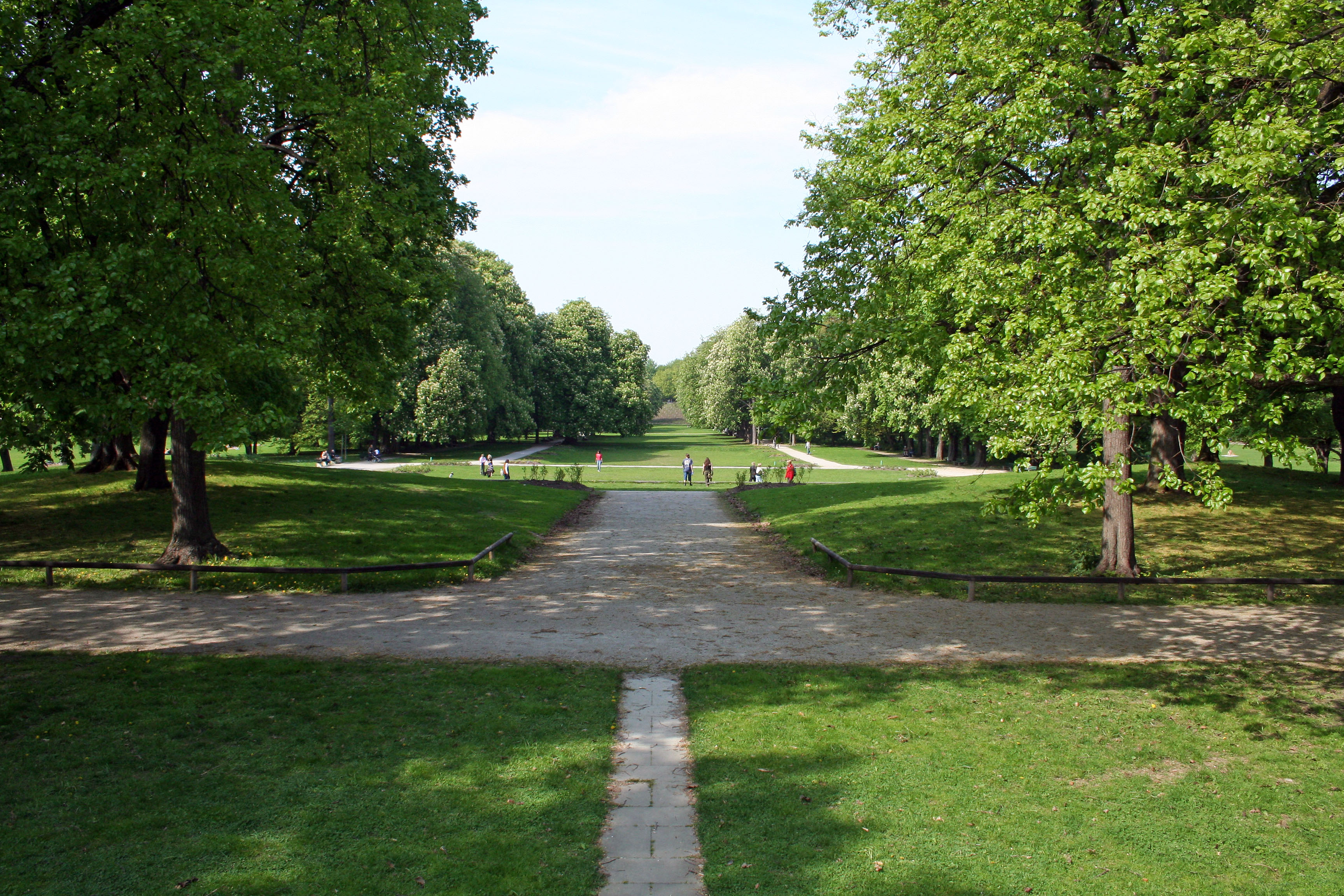
Luitpoldpark

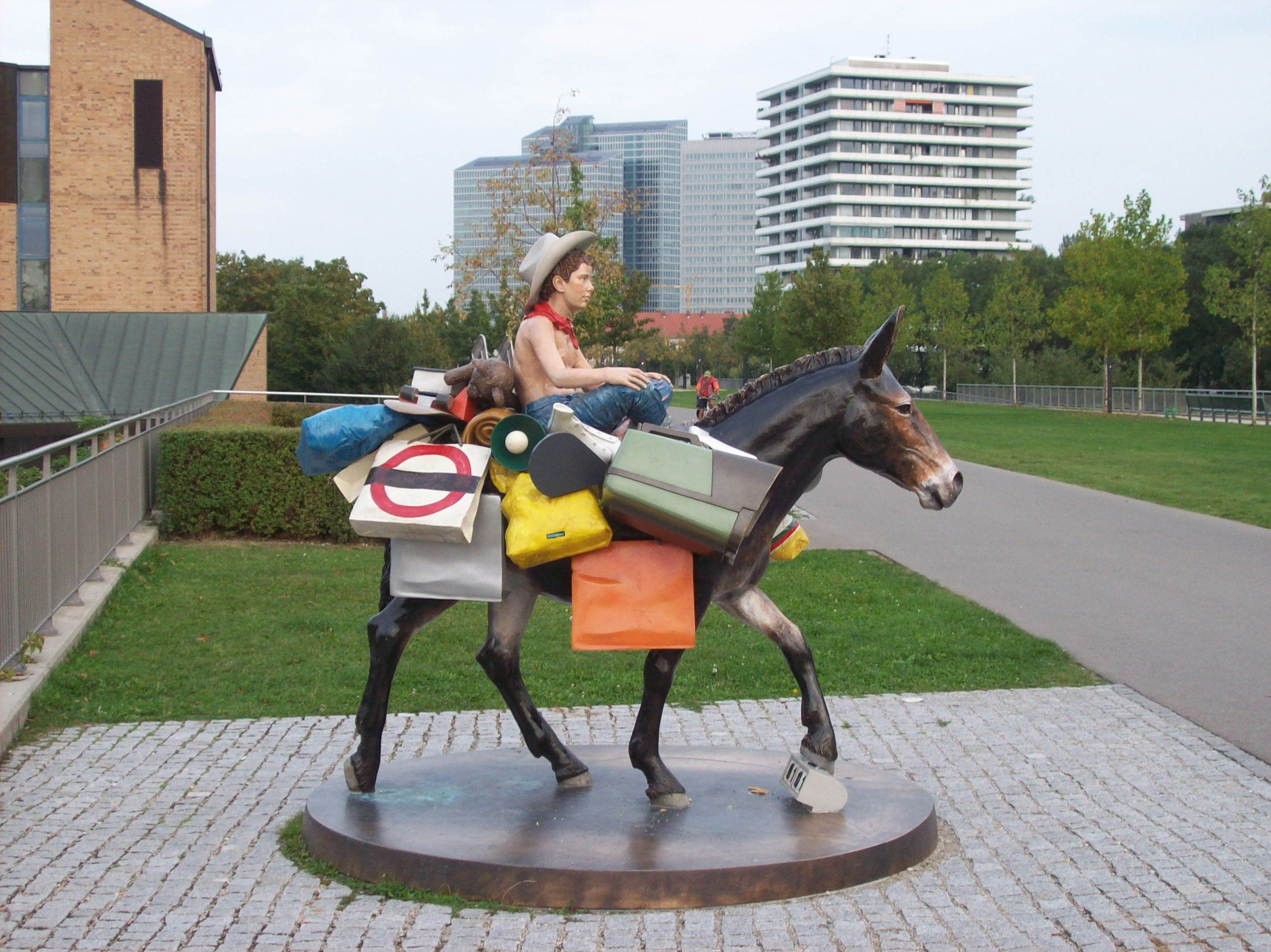
Petuelpark

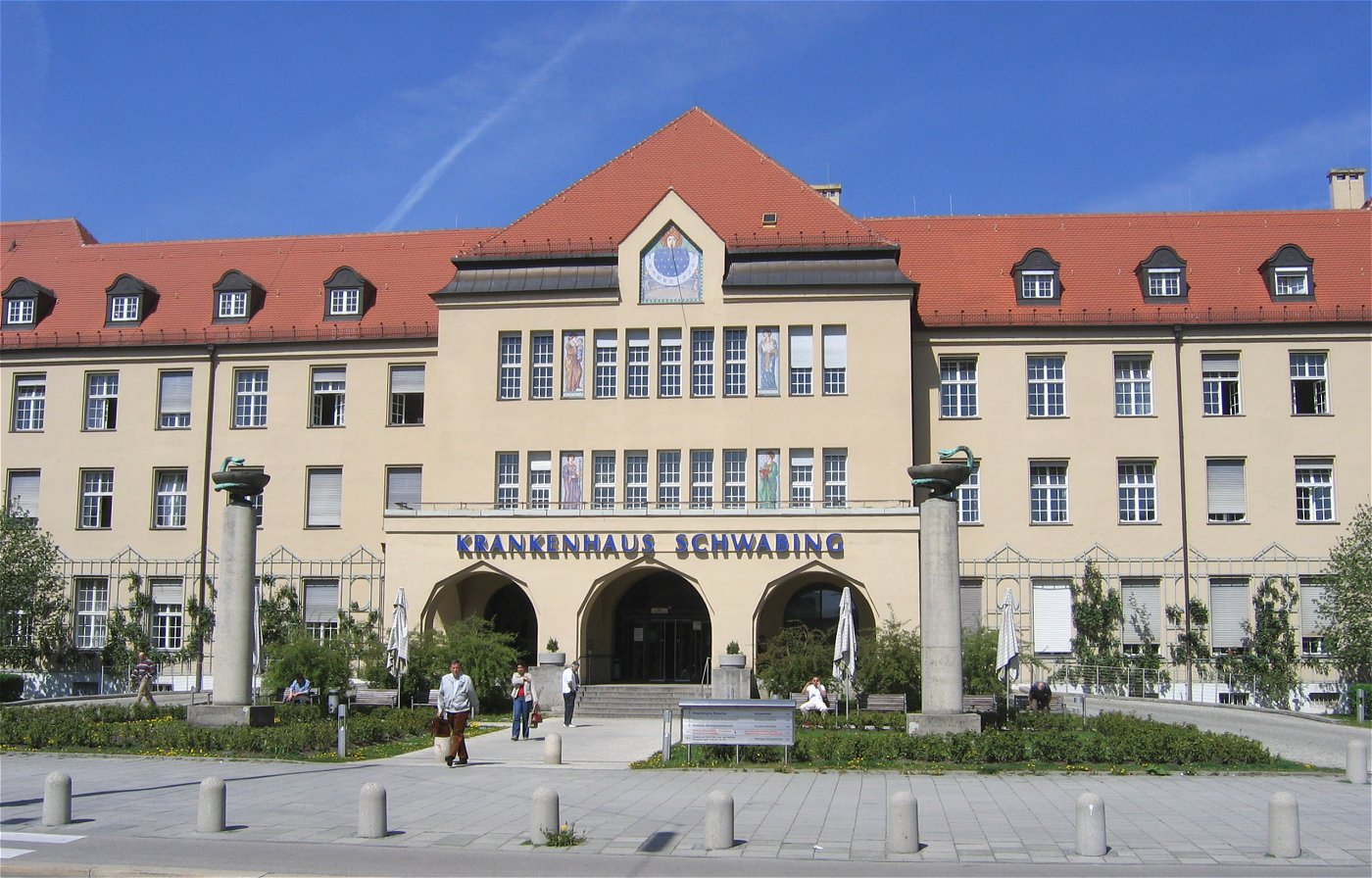
Schwabinger Krankenhaus

=== 5 – Au-Haidhausen ===
Ostbahnhof, Orleansplatz, St.-Wolfgangs-Platz, TSV München-Ost, Regerplatz, Auer Mühlbach, Am Neudeck, Mariahilfplatz, Zeppelinstraße, Franz-Prüller-Straße, Paulanerplatz, Lilienstraße, Gasteig, Preysingplatz, Johannisplatz, Wiener Platz, Max-Weber-Platz, Villa Stuck, Trogerstraße, Einsteinstraße, Kirchenstraße, Preysingstraße, Wörthstraße

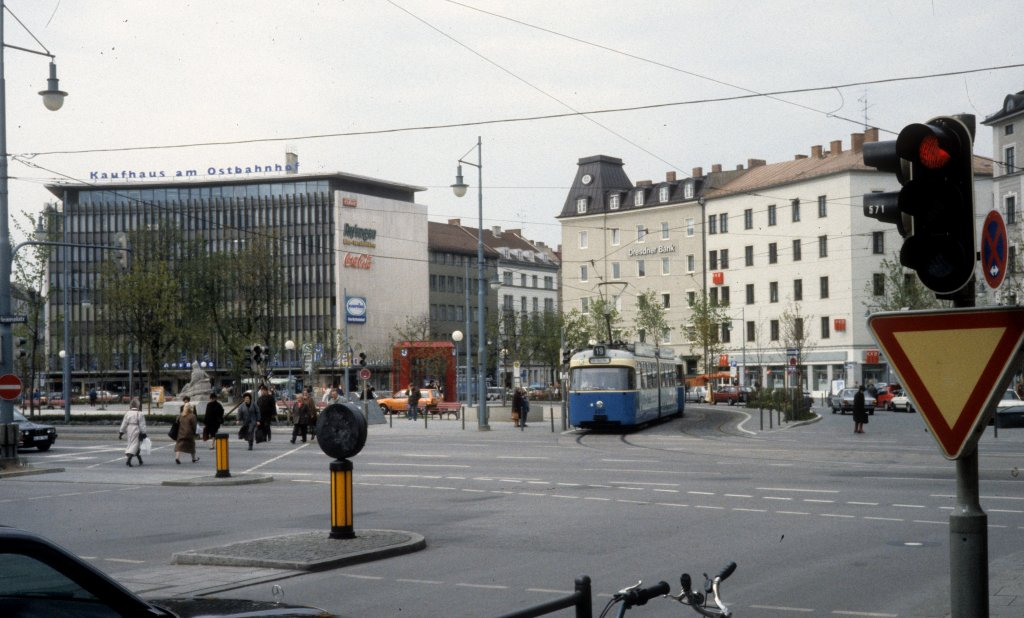
Orleansplatz

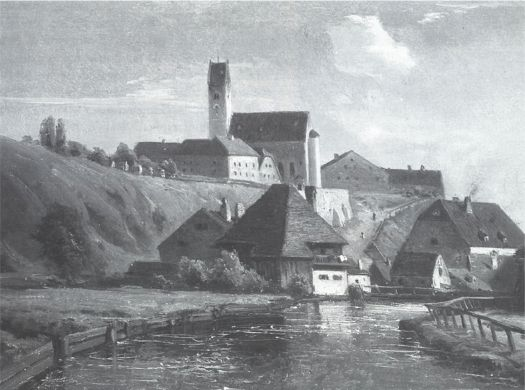
Auer Mühlbach around 1850

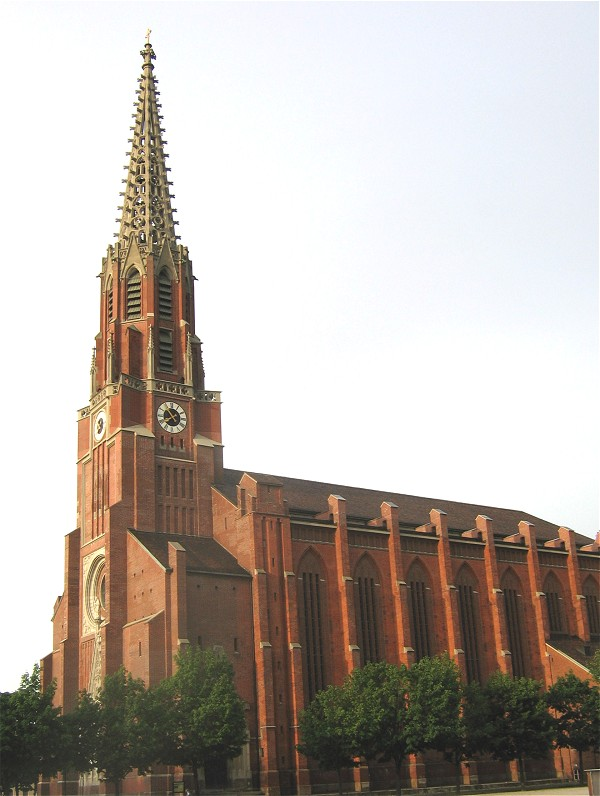
Mariahilfkirche

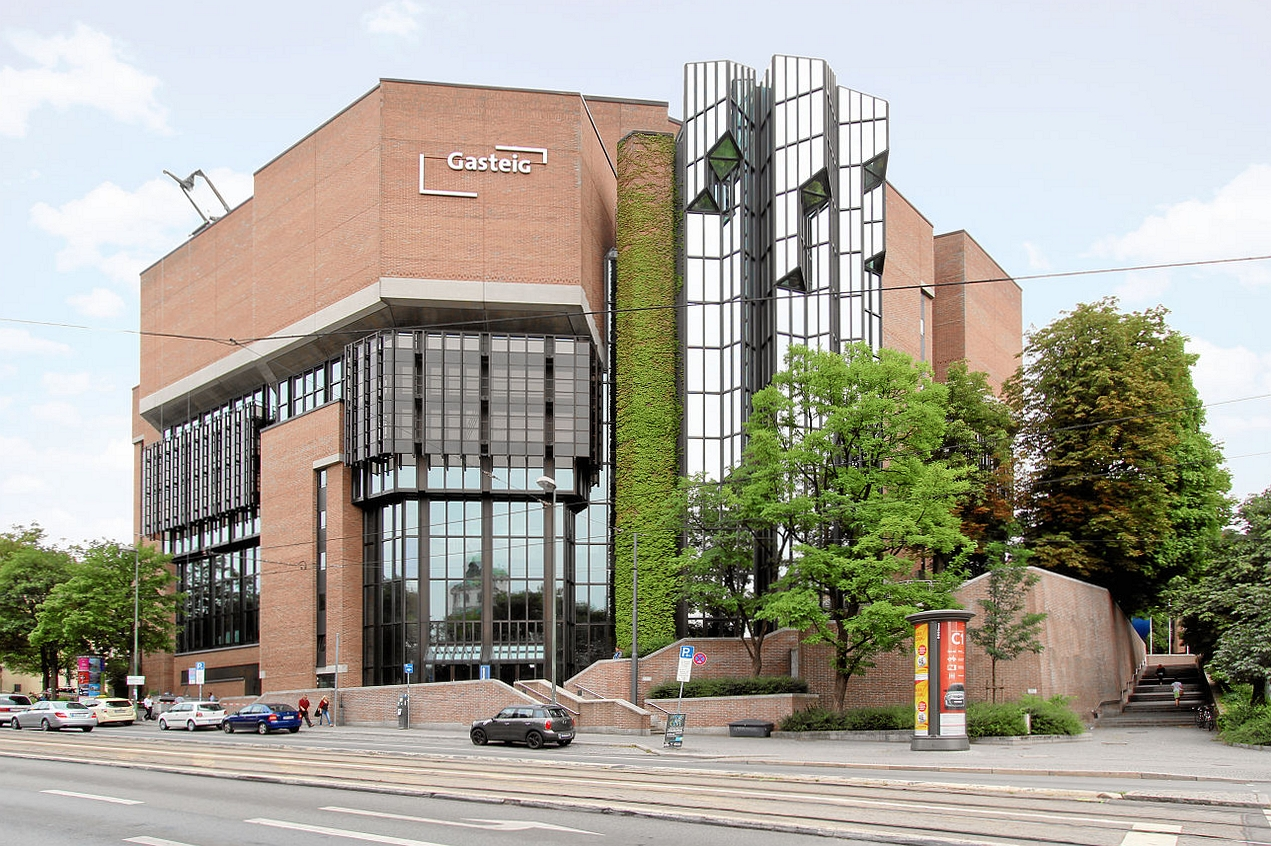
Gasteig

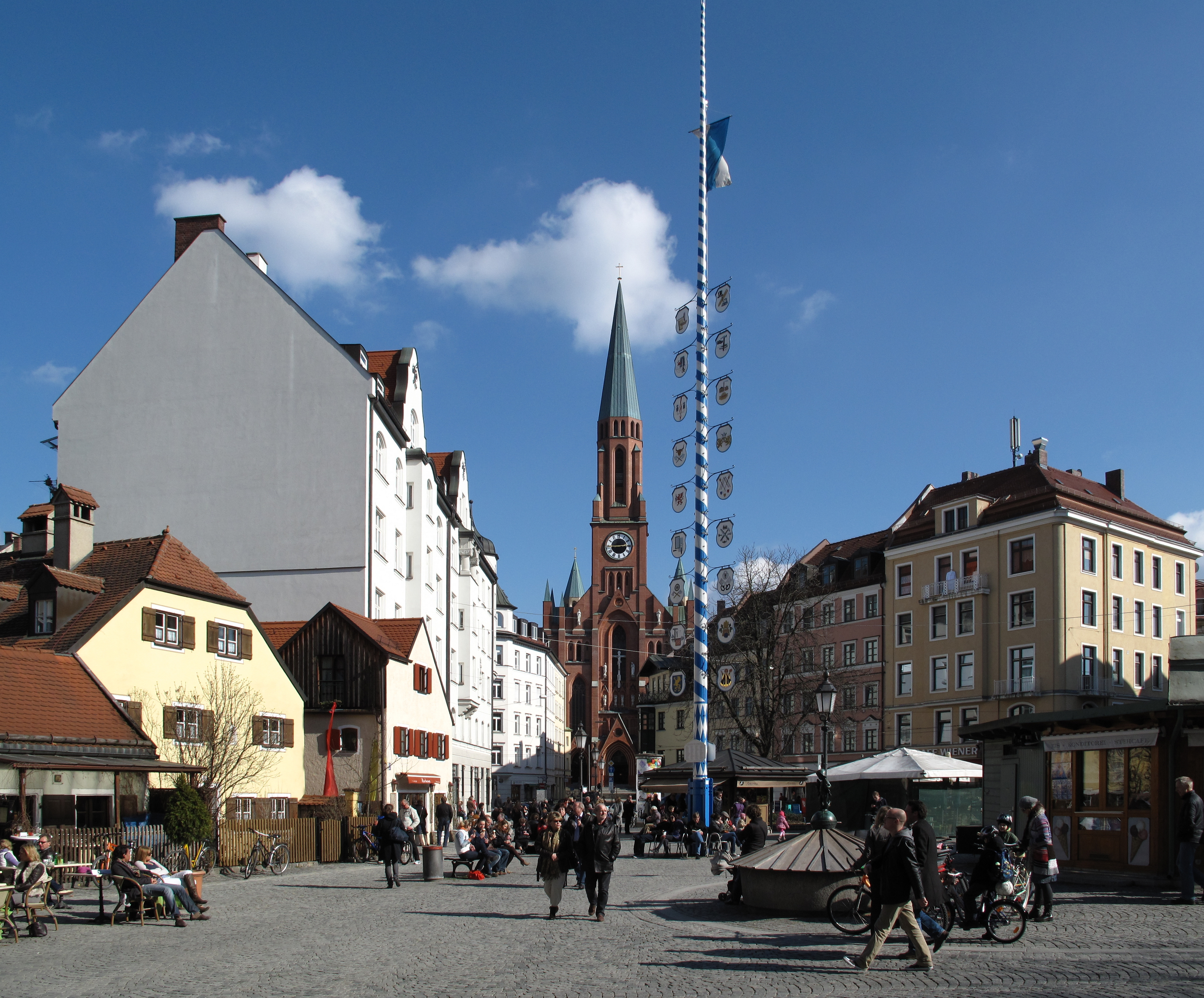
Wiener Platz

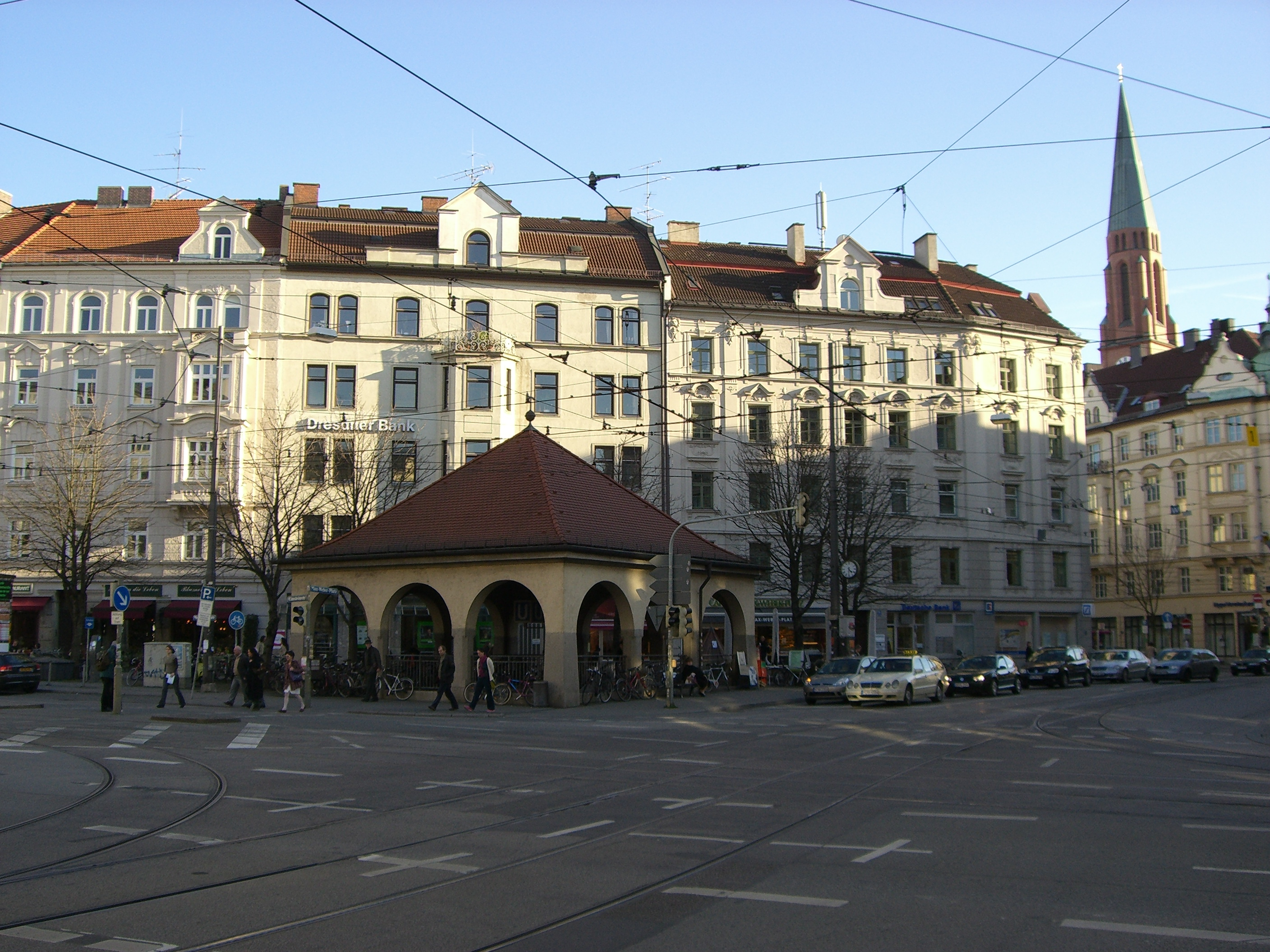
Max-Weber-Platz

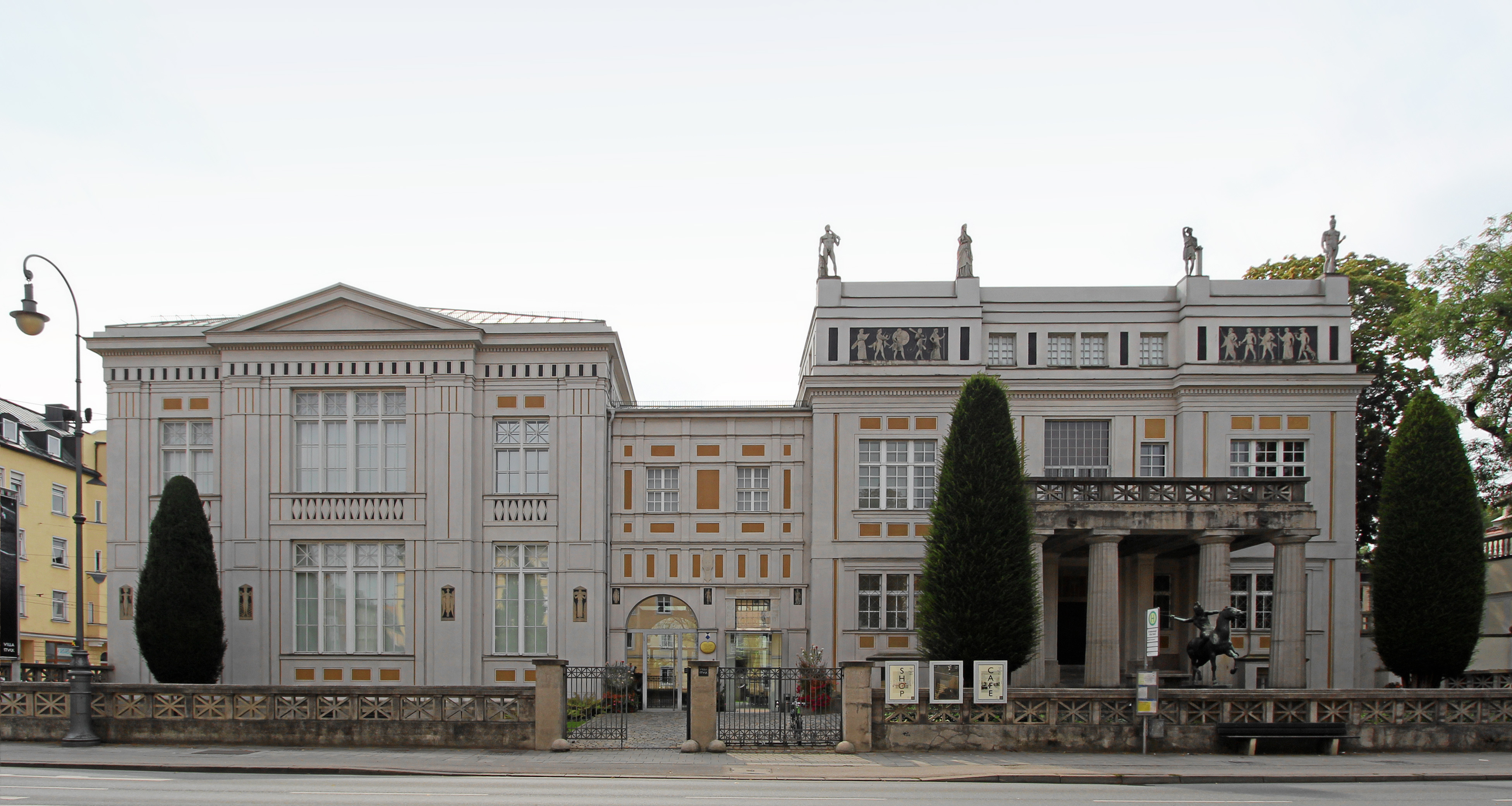
Villa Stuck

=== 8 – Schwanthalerhöhe ===
Tour from Bavaria via Landsberger Straße to the former Drexler barrel factory: Ruhmeshalle and Bavaria, Bavaria Park, Sinti-Roma-Platz, Old Exhibition Grounds, shooting range, beer cellar, Hauberrisser House, airplane crash of 17 December 1960, Augustiner-Bräu, organ builder Franz Borgias Maerz, St. Benedict's, Schrenkschule, Multicultural Youth Centre, Drexler barrel factory.

Tour from Trappentreustraße via Gollierplatz to the former home of the working-class writer August Kühn: Trappentreustraße, Hauptzollamt (Main Customs Office), Guldein School, Leopold and Maria Moskovitz, Metzeler Rubber Factory, St. Rupert, Bergmannschule (Miners' School), Auferstehungskirche (Church of the Resurrection), Home for Single People, Ridlerschule, Moll-Blöcke, Josef Zott, August Kühn

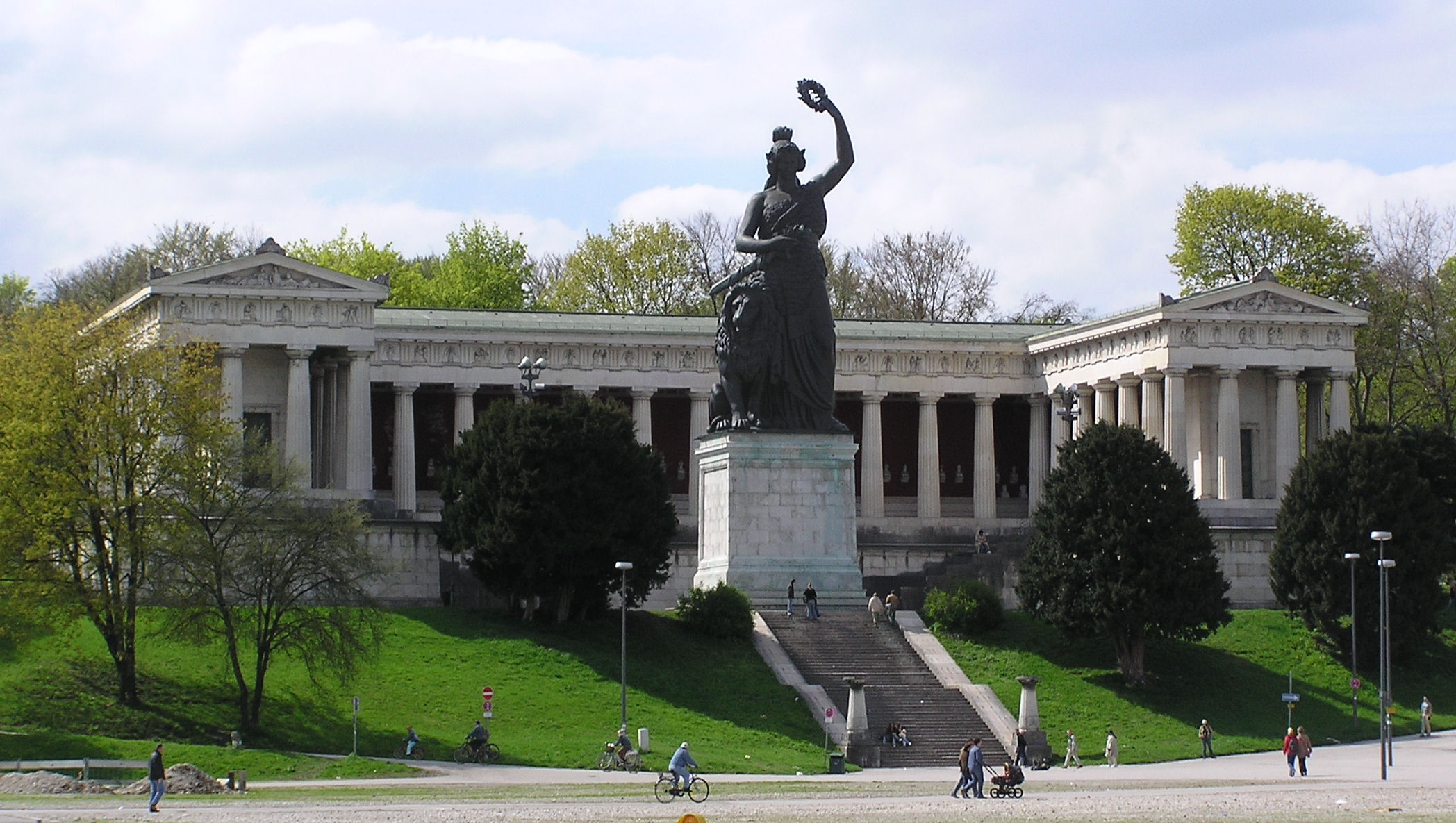
Bavaria

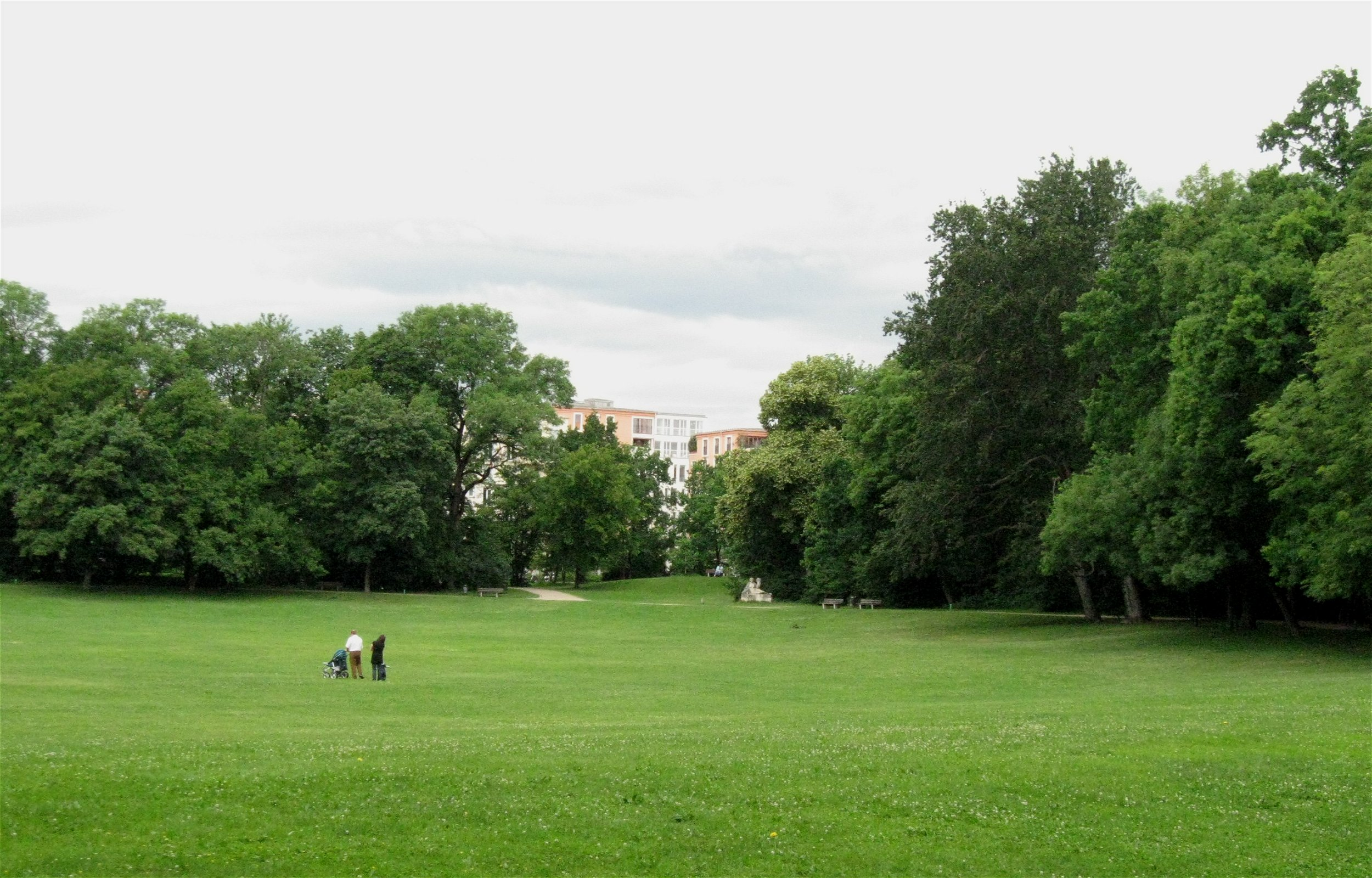
Bavariapark

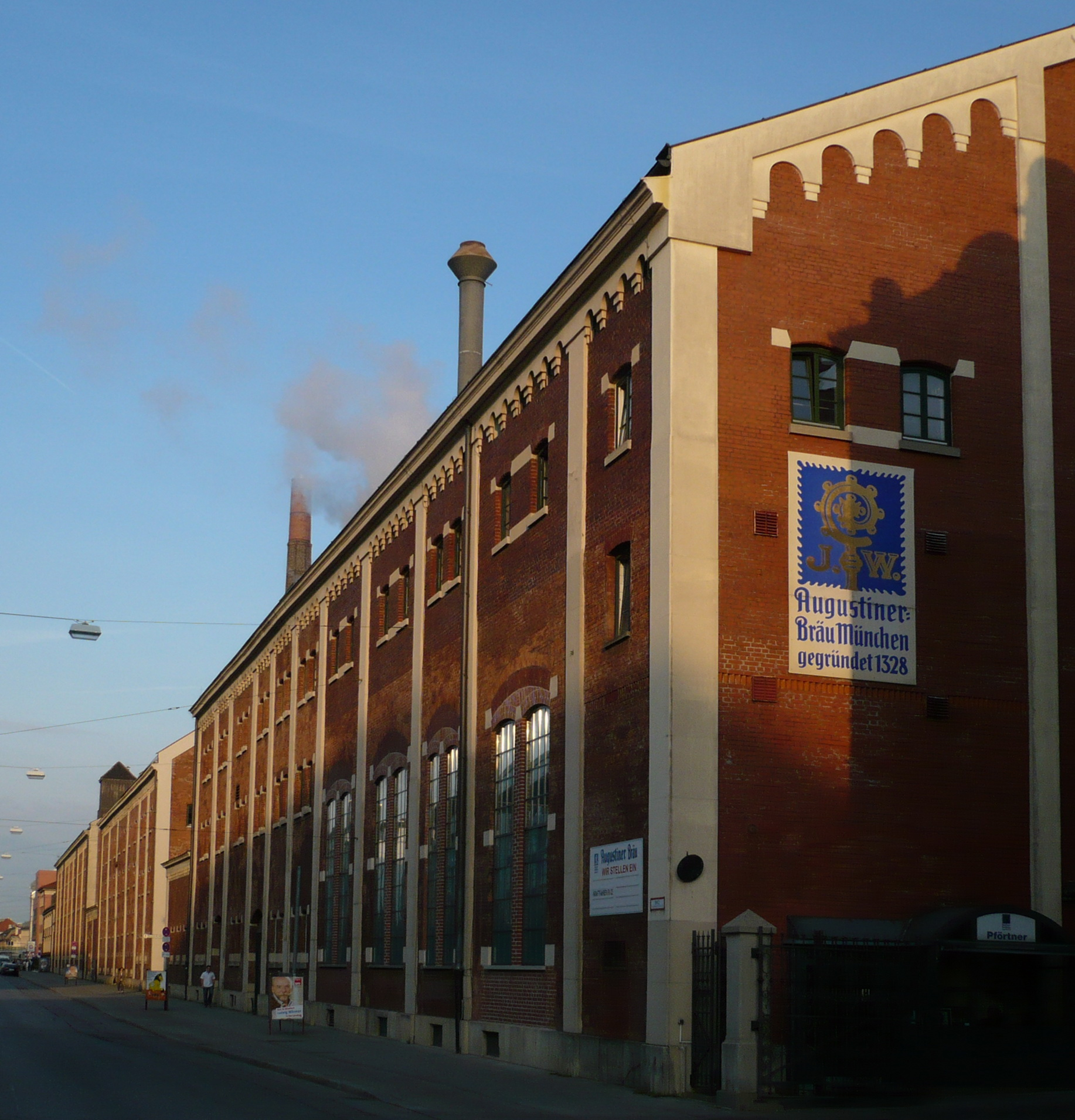
Augustinerbrauerei

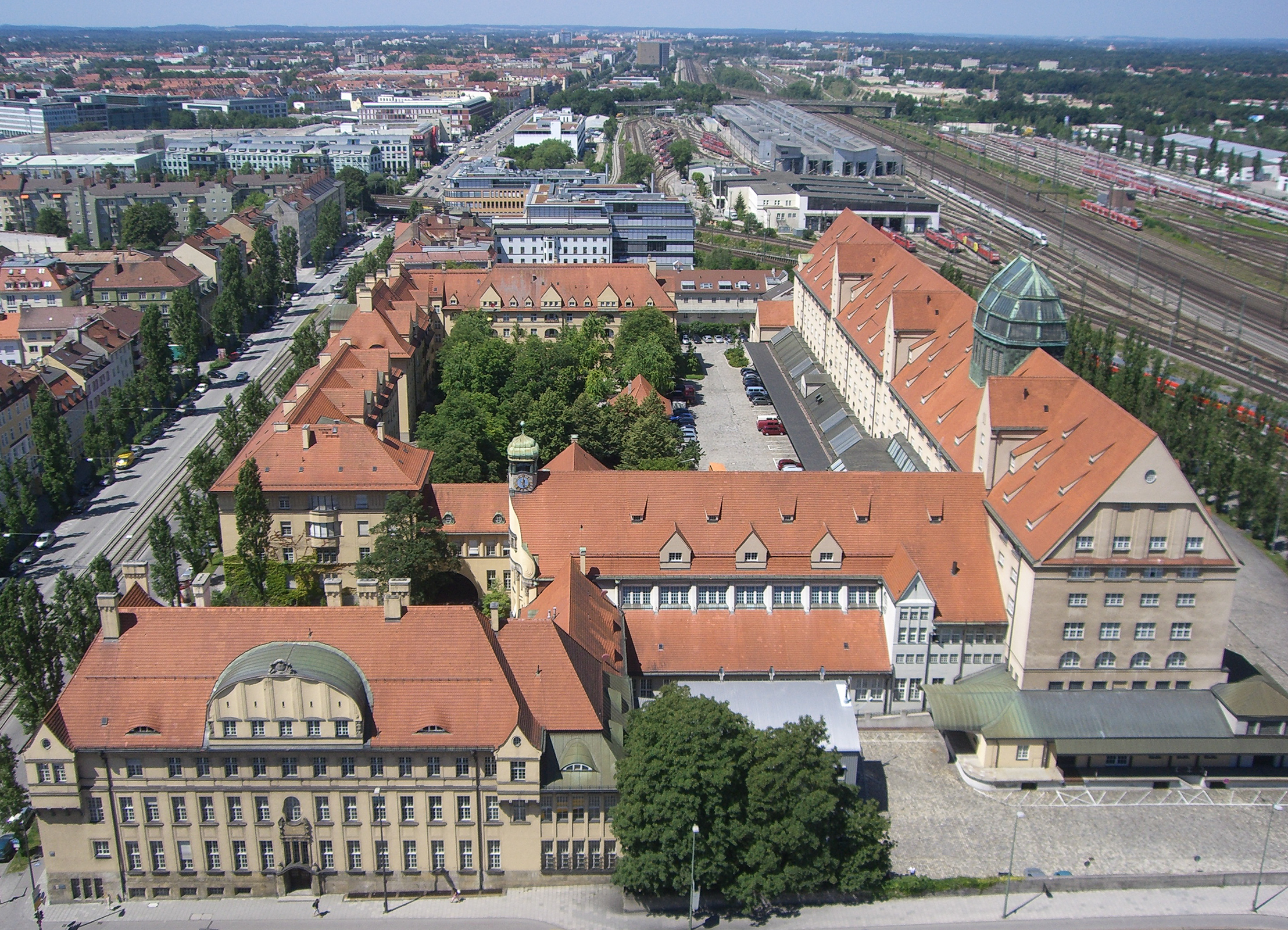
Ehem. Hauptzollamt

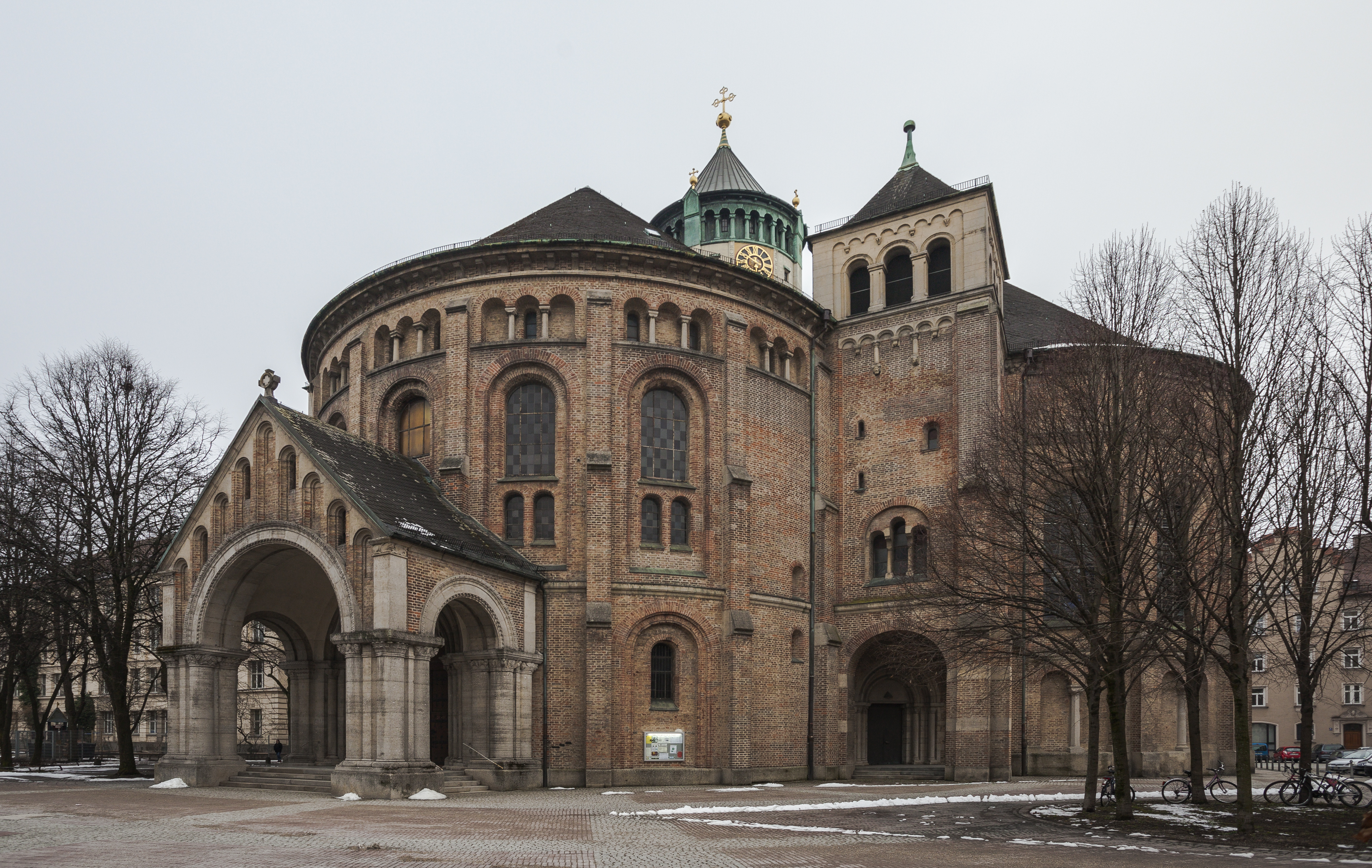
St. Rupert

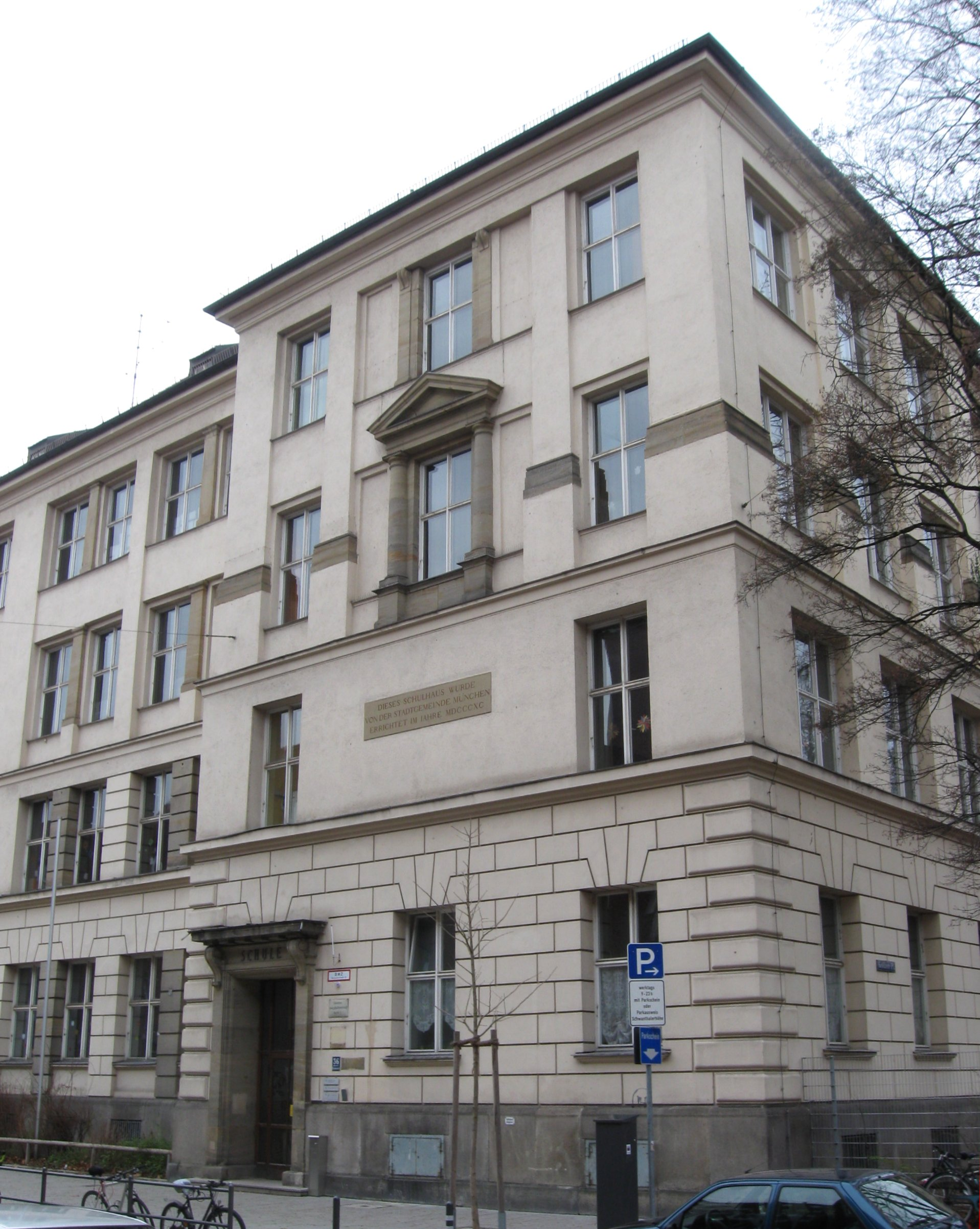
Bergmannschule

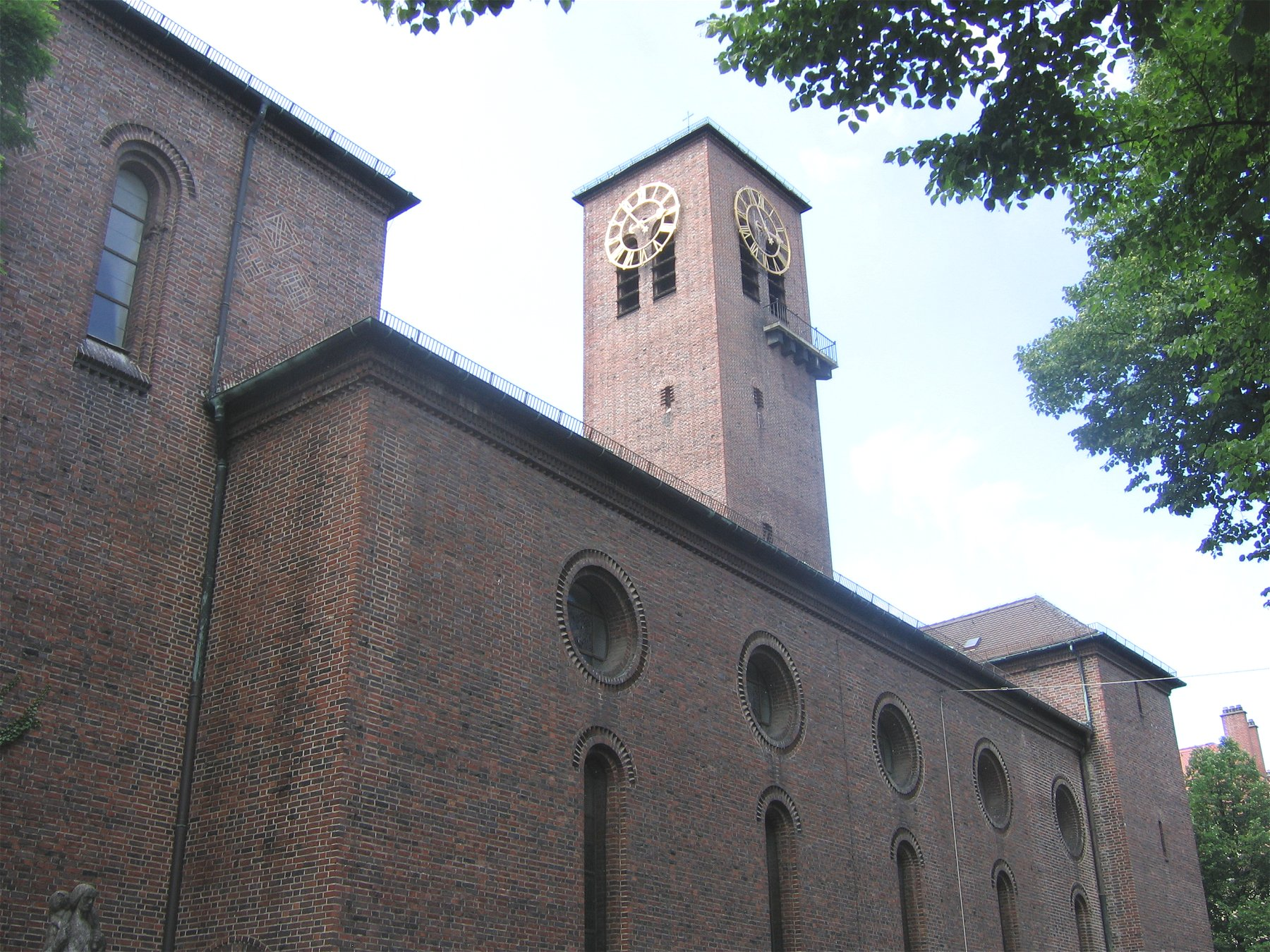
Auferstehungskirche

=== 9 – Neuhausen-Nymphenburg ===
Rotkreuzplatz, Nymphenburger Straße, Winthirstraße, Schlosskanal, Romanstraße, Ludwig-Ferdinand-Brücke, Dall'Armi-Bürgerheim, Nymphenburg-Biedersteiner Kanal, Villenkolonie Gern, Taxisgarten, Dom-Pedro-Platz, Pedestrian bridge Braganzastraße, Dachauer Straße, Leonrodstraße, Platz der Freiheit, Donnersbergerstraße, Richelstraße, Renatastraße, Künstlerhof, Steubenplatz, Winthirplatz.

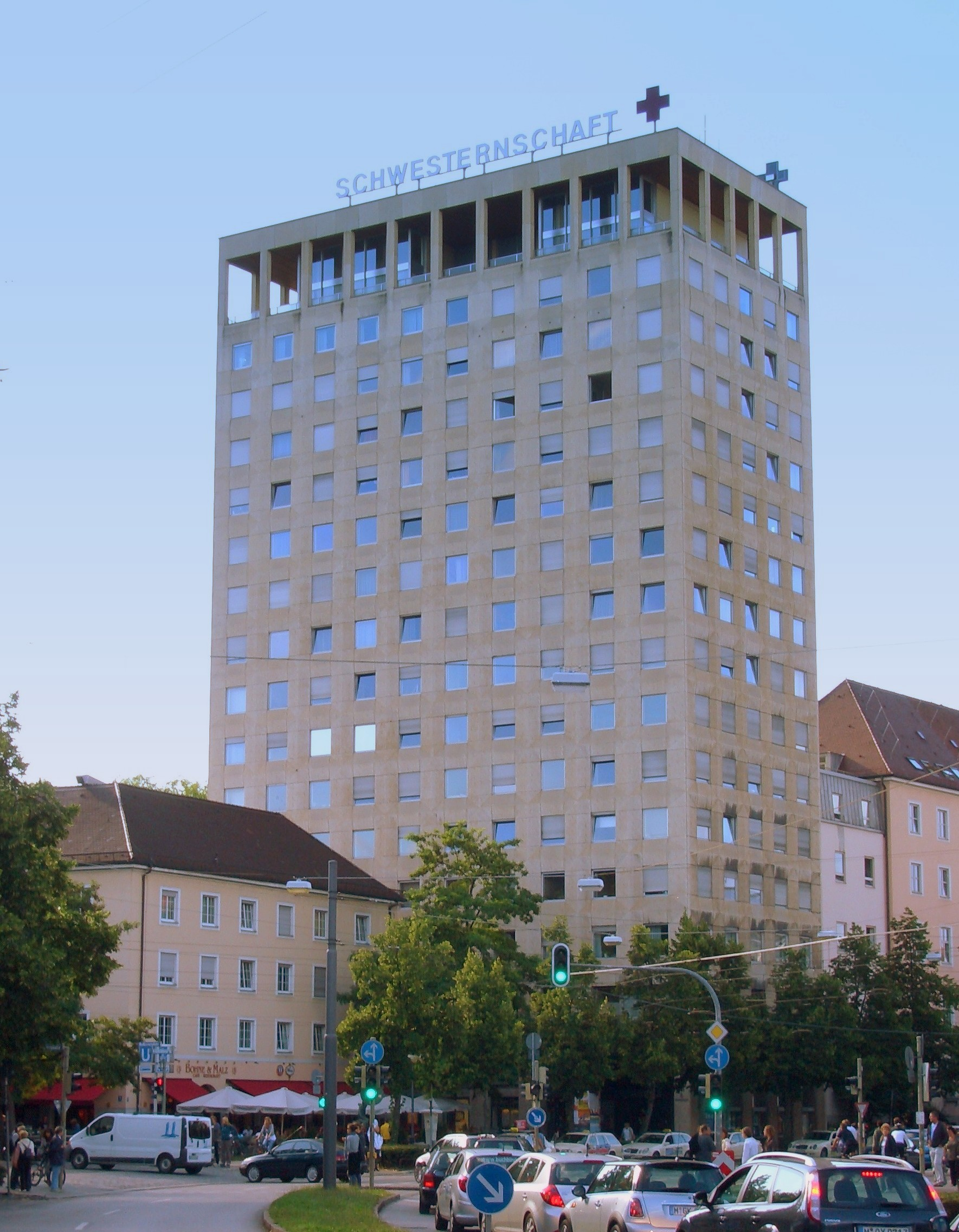
Rotkreuzplatz

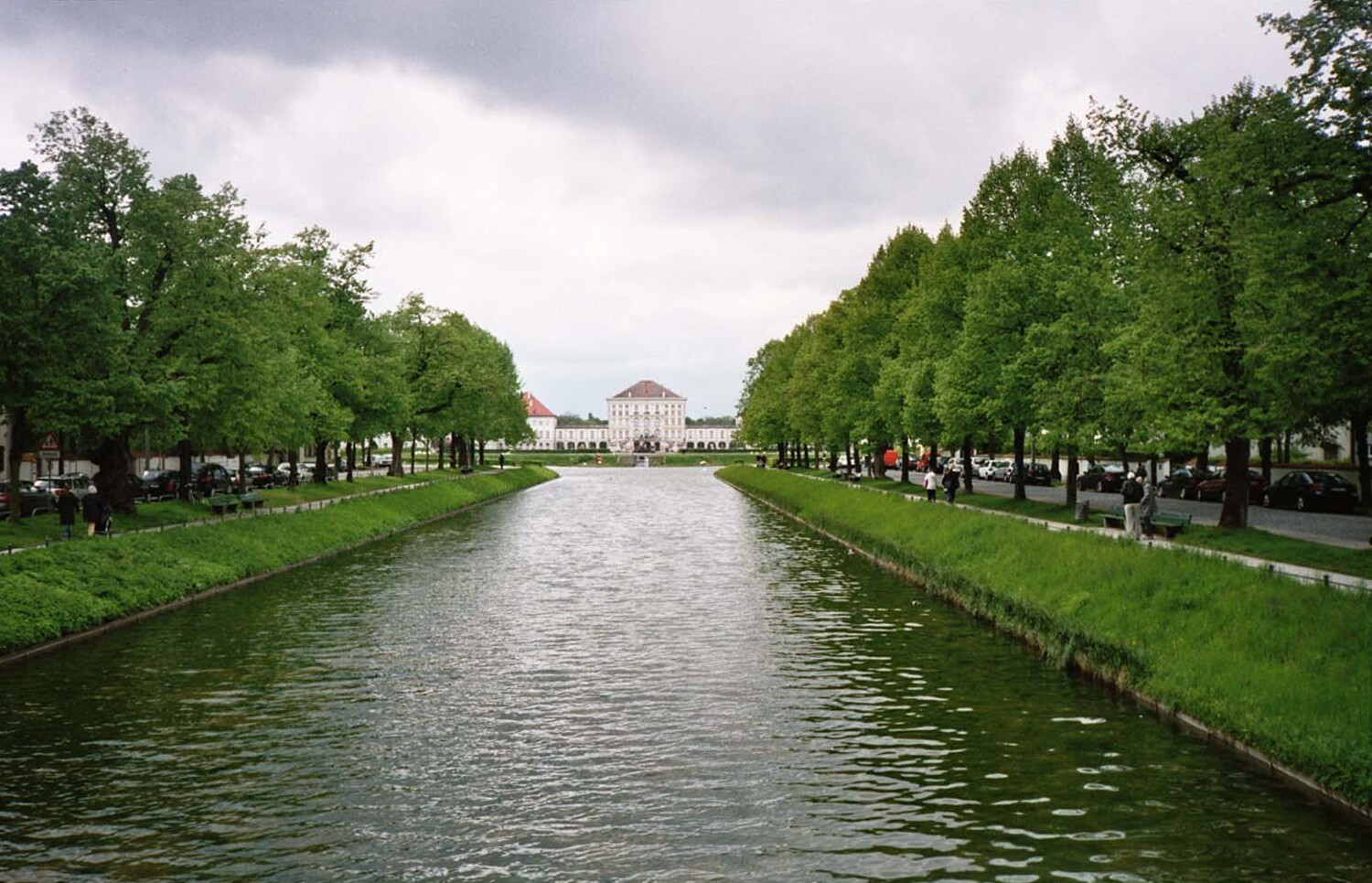
Schlosskanal

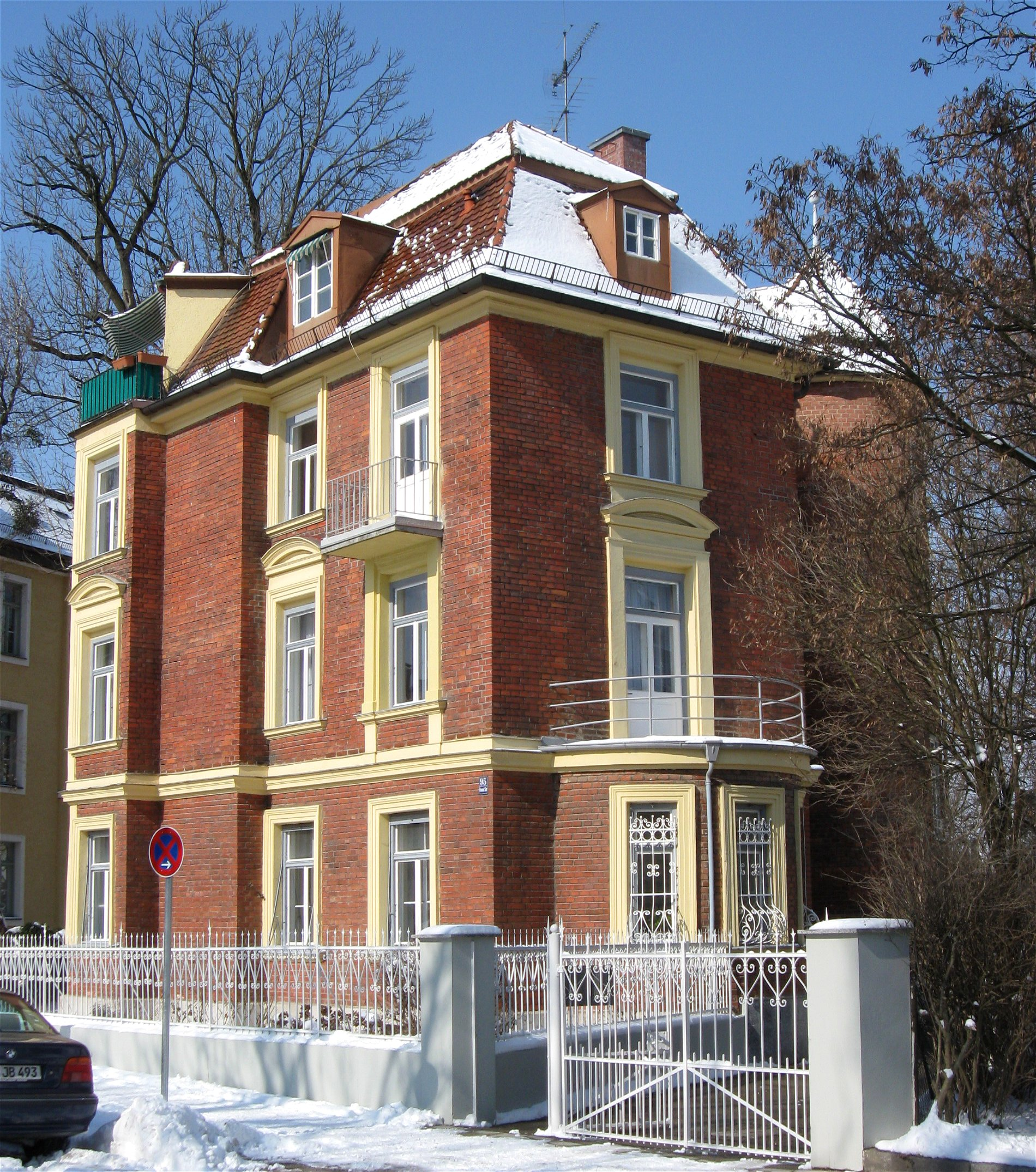
Romanstraße

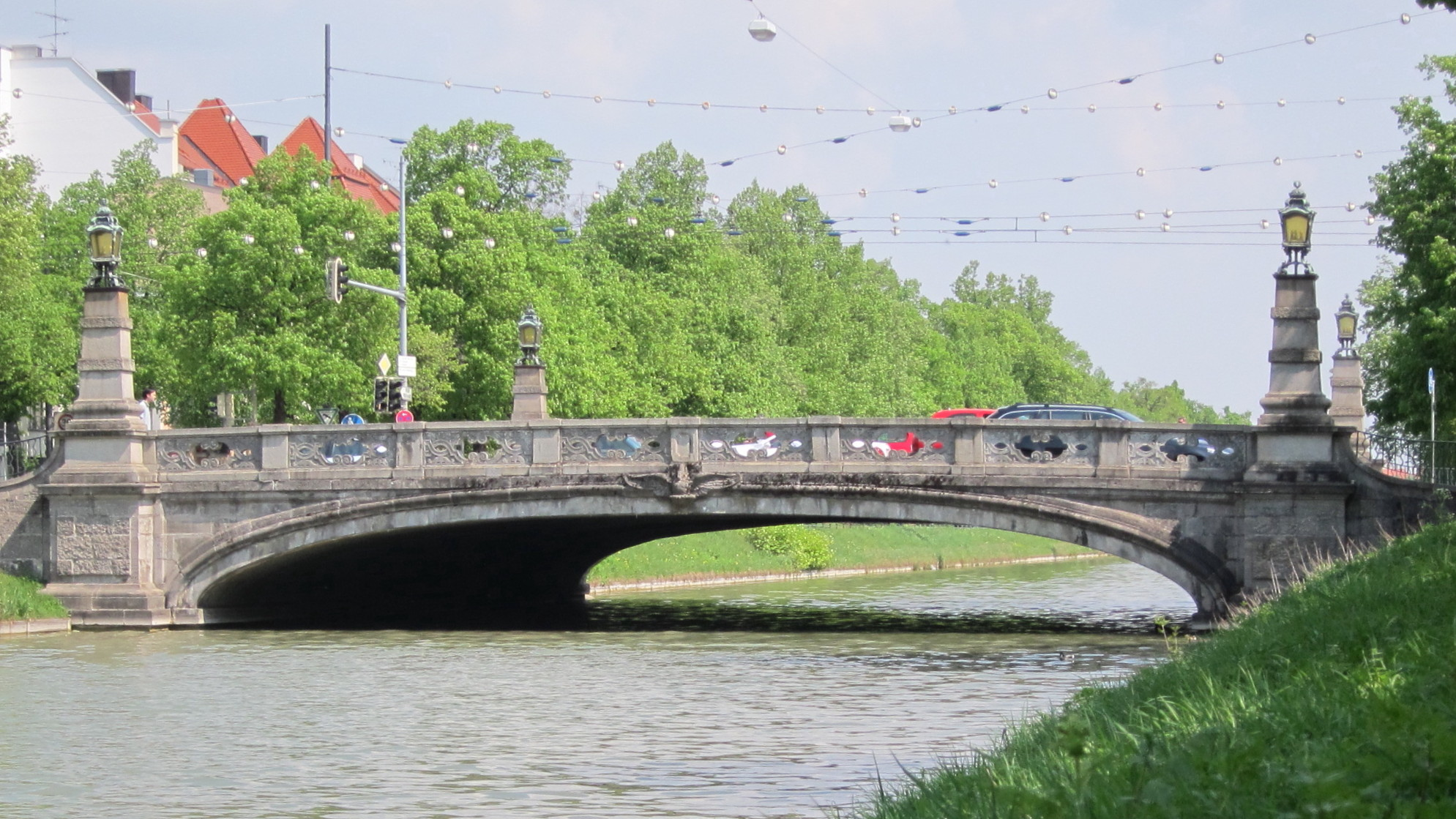
Ludwig-Ferdinand-Brücke

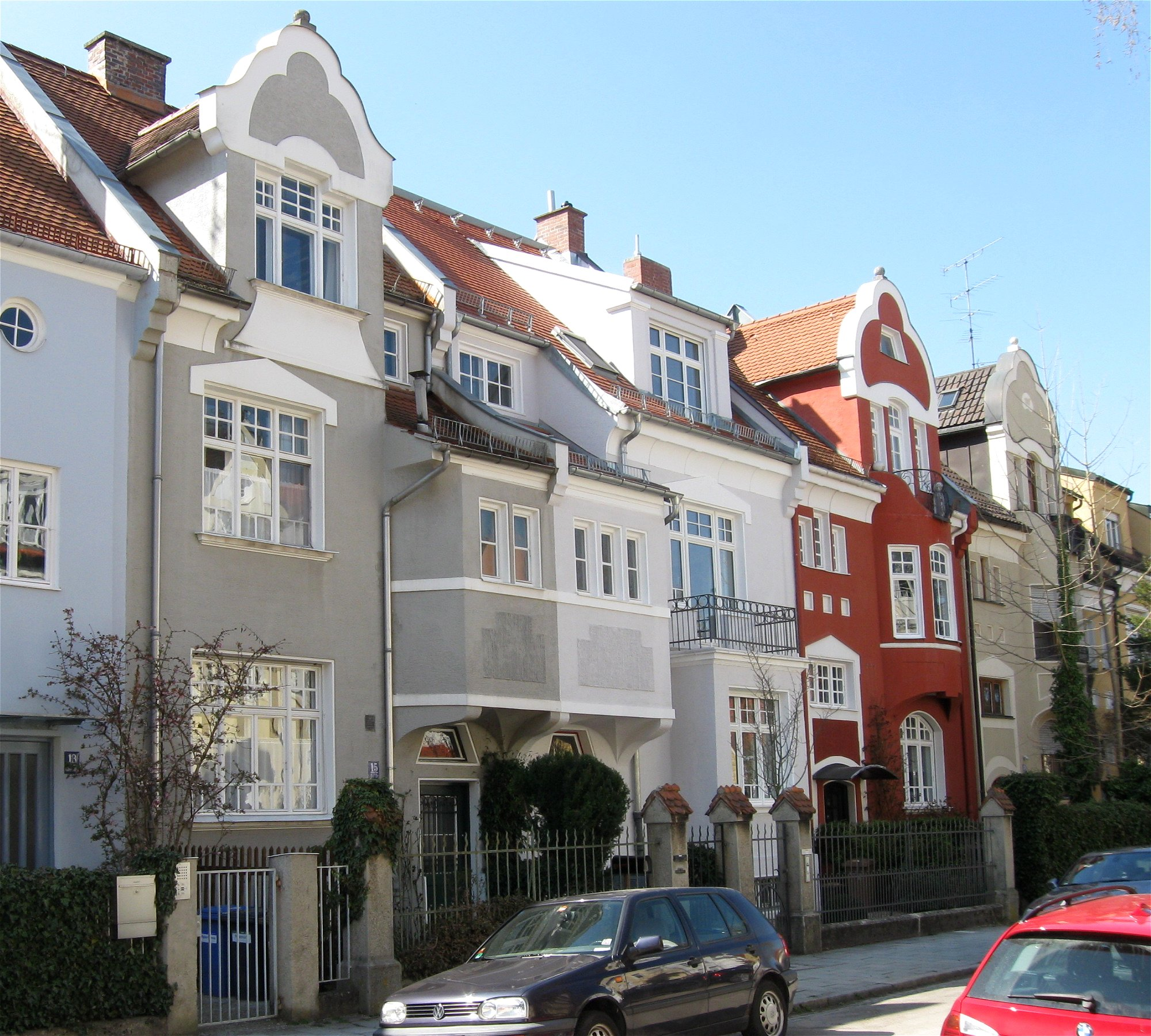
Villenkolonie Gern

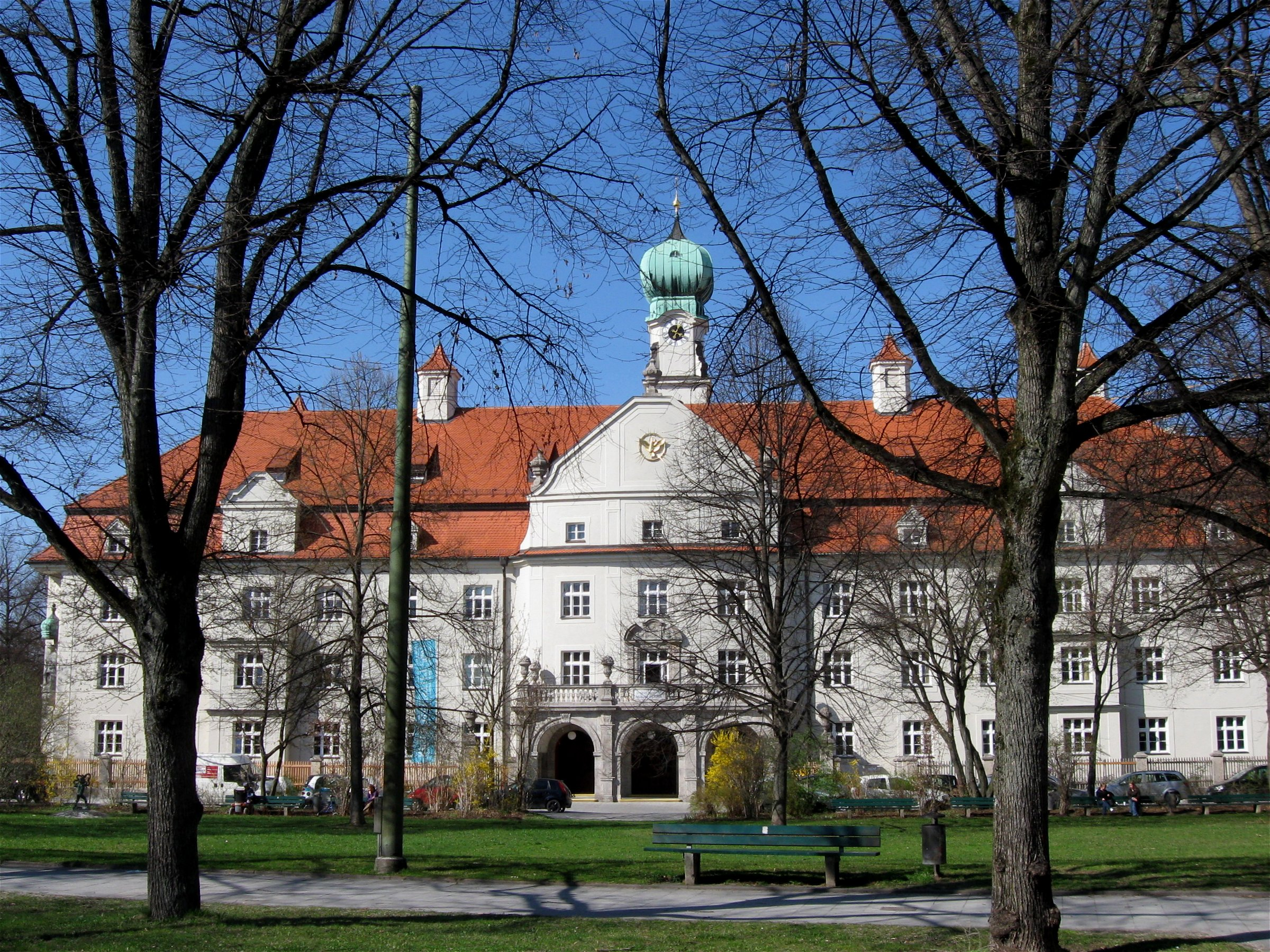
Dom-Pedro-Platz

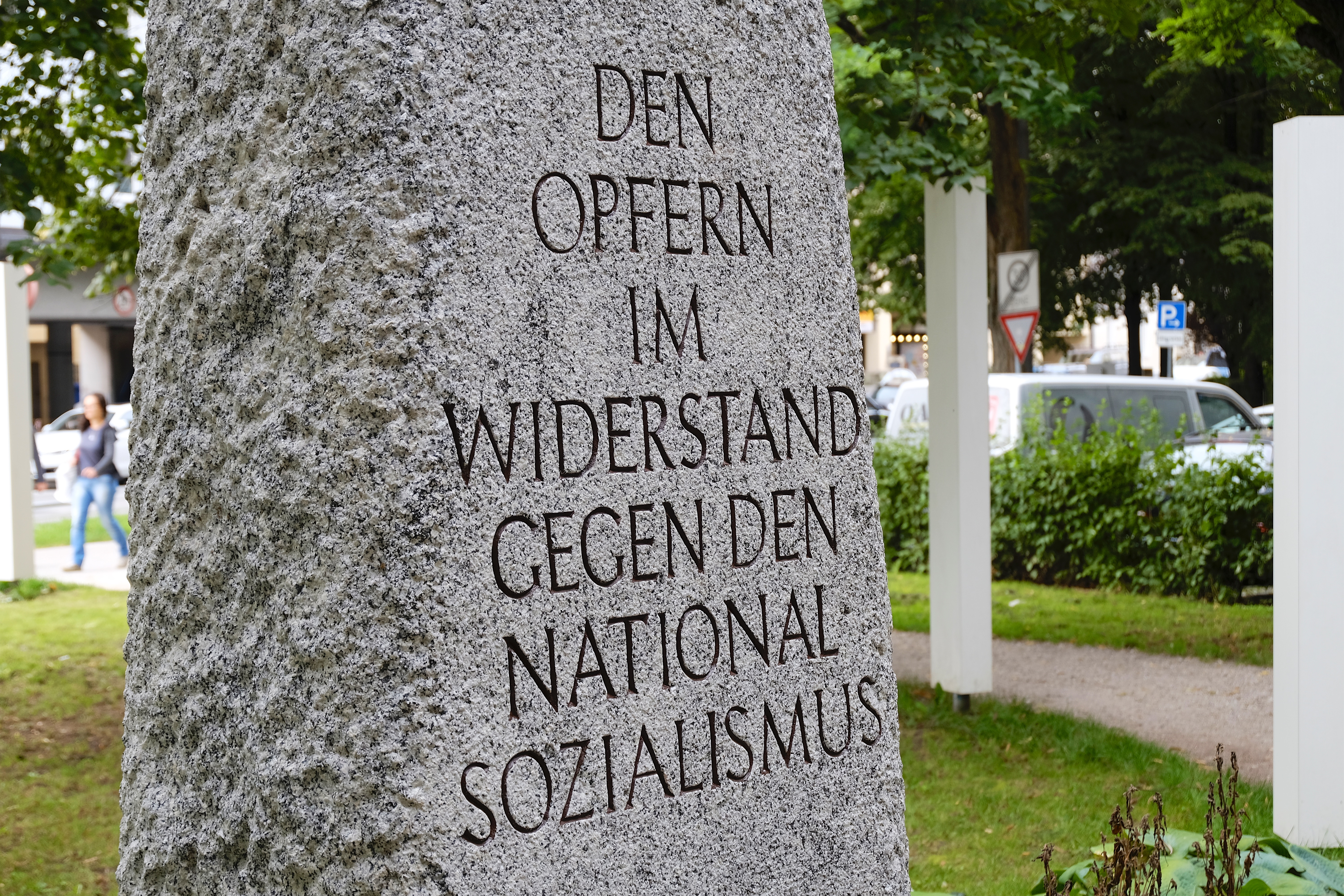
Platz der Freiheit

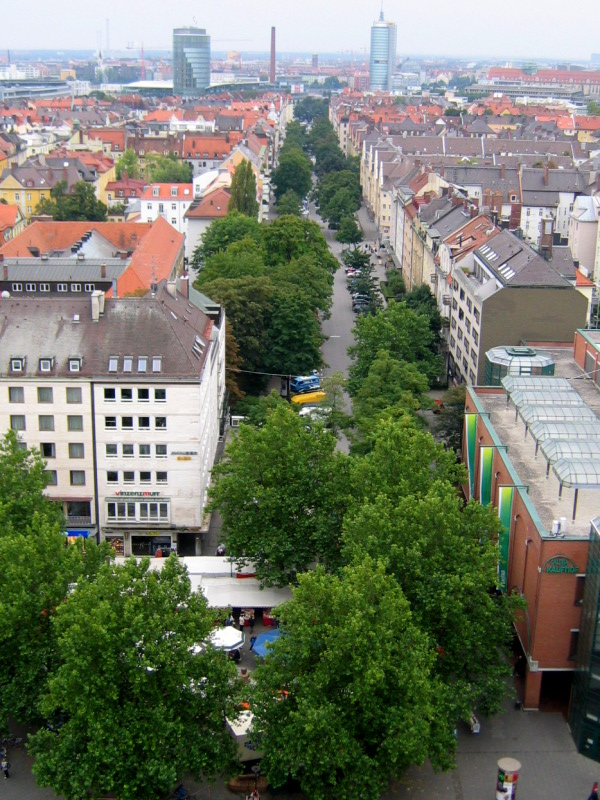
Donners-
bergerstraße

=== 10 – Moosach ===
Moosach village and Hofmark: Pelkovenschlössl, Alte Kirche St. Martin, Pelkovenstraße I, The Moosacher Stachus, Moosach railway station, Karlingerstraße housing estate, Heilig-Geist-Kirche, Neue Kirche St. Martin, School on Jenaer Straße, Feldmochinger Straße, Pelkovenstraße II, Moosach work education camp

Moosach since industrialisation: Olympia-Einkaufszentrum, Olympic press town, Gaswerk Moosach, Borstei, Westfriedhof, Nederling, Hartmannshofen, Trinkl-Siedlung, Reigersbach, München Nord Rangierbahnhof (marshalling yard), Rathgeber/Meiller

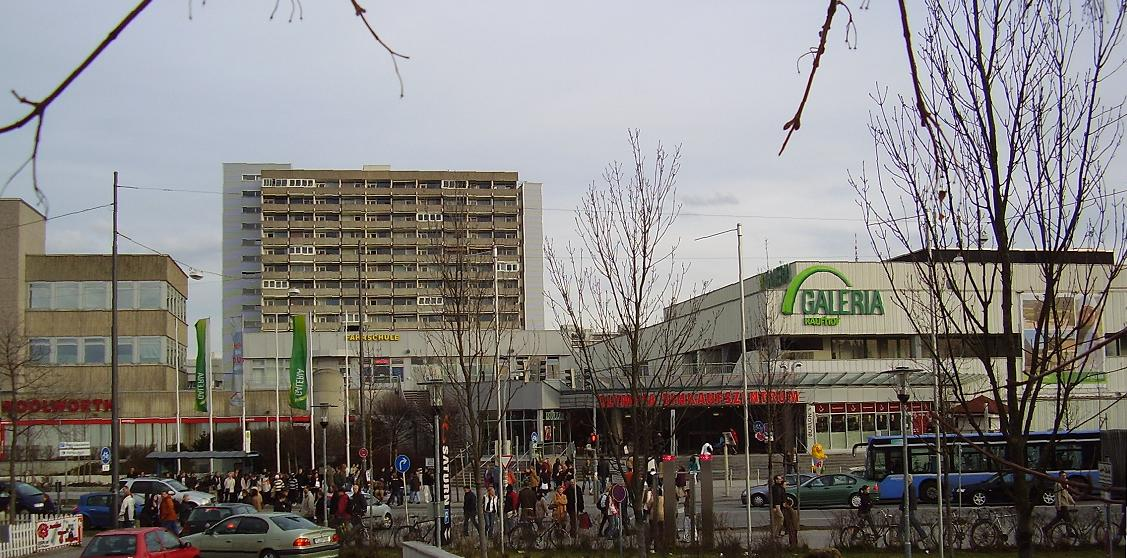
Olympia Einkaufszentrum

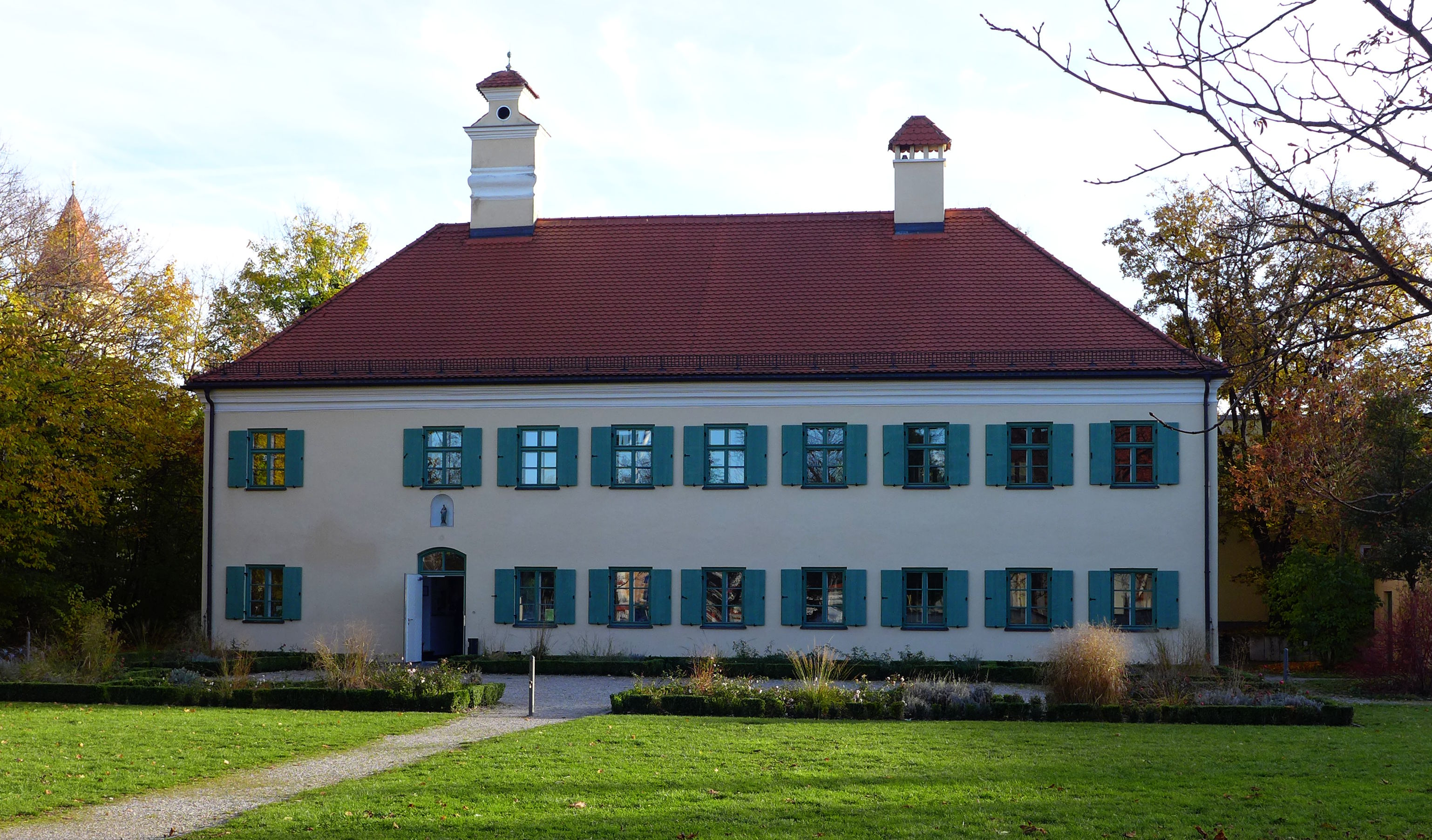
Pelkovenschlössl

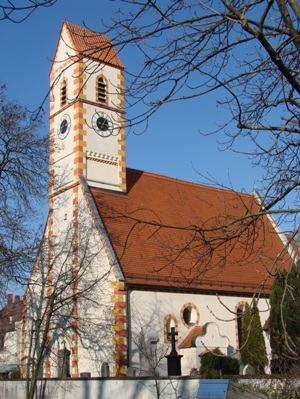
Alte Pfarrkirche St. Martin

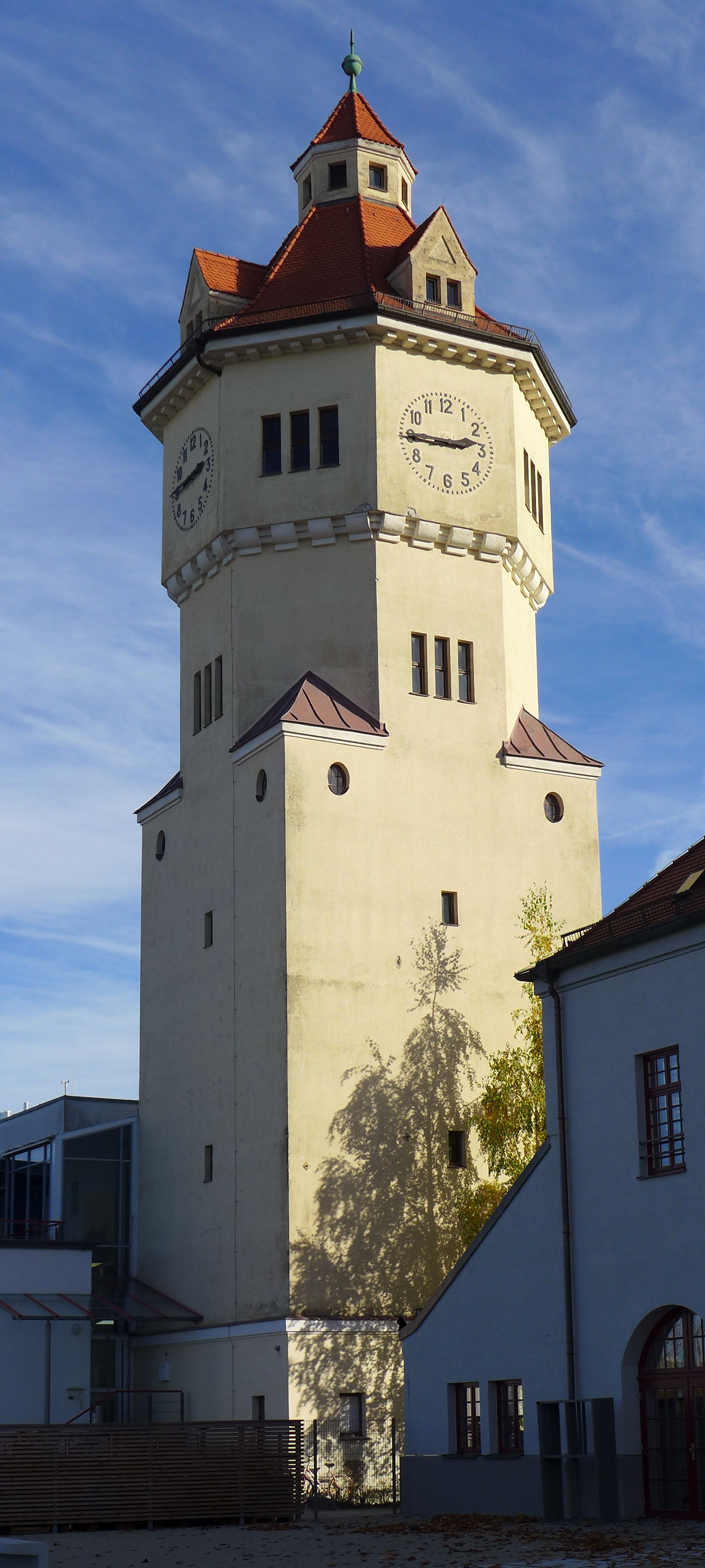
Wasser-
turm

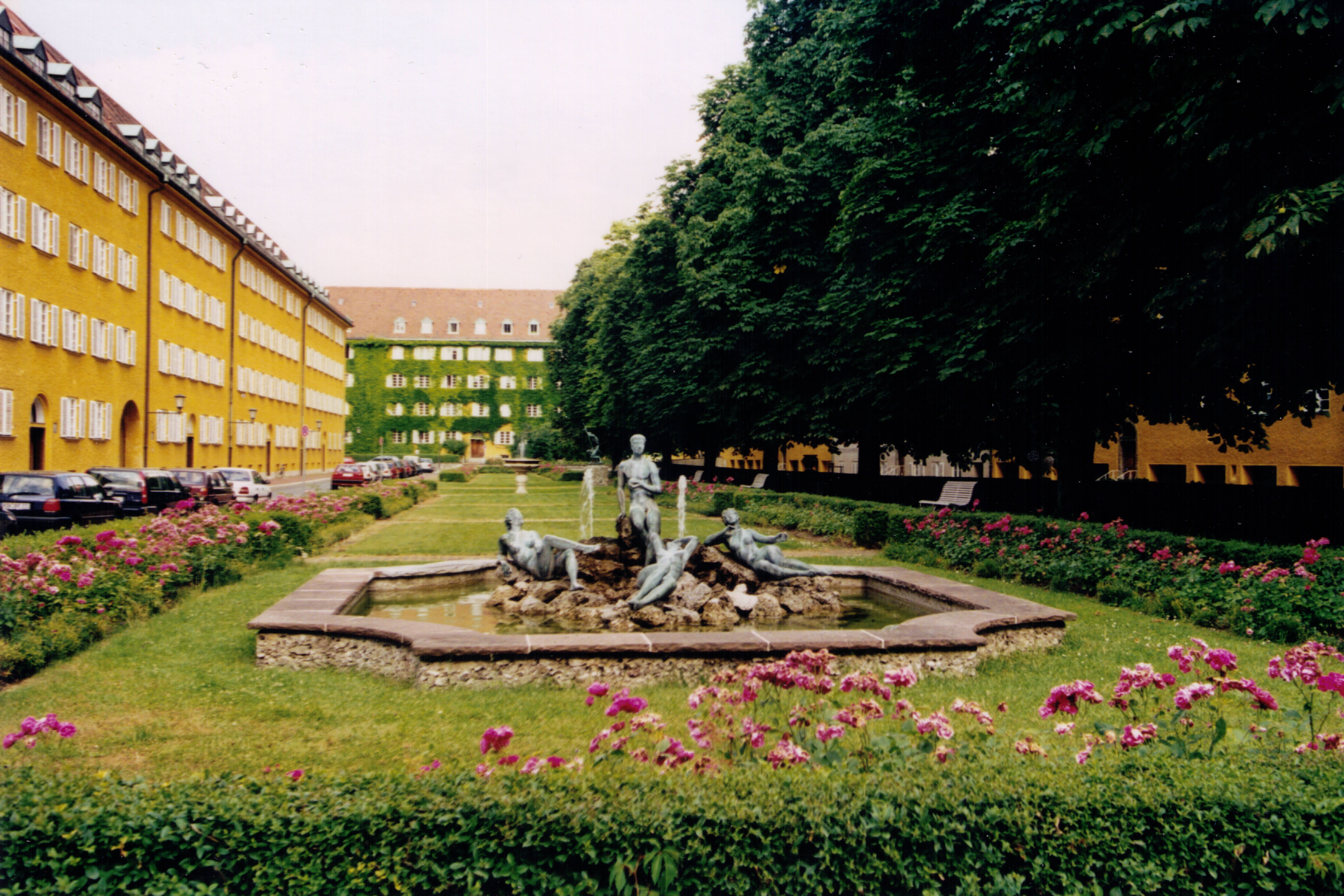
Borstei

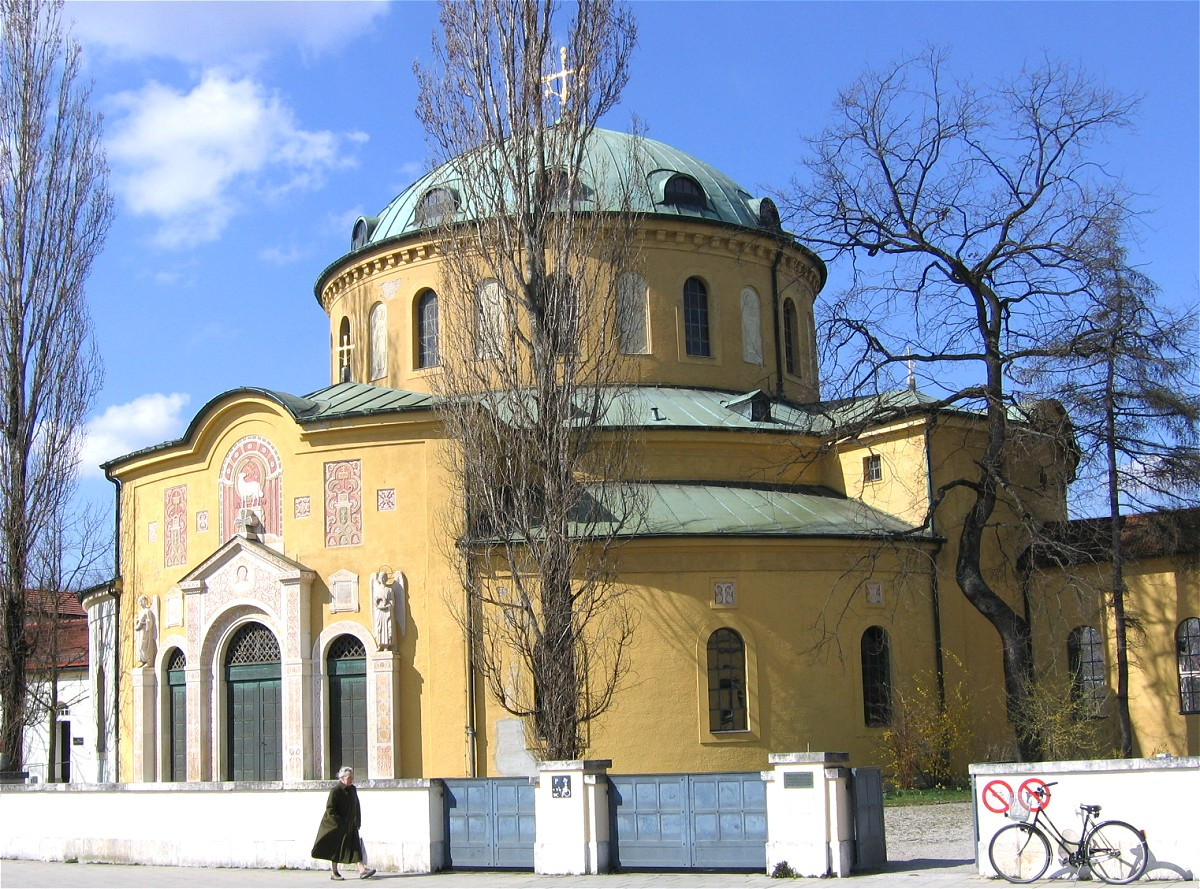
Westfriedhof

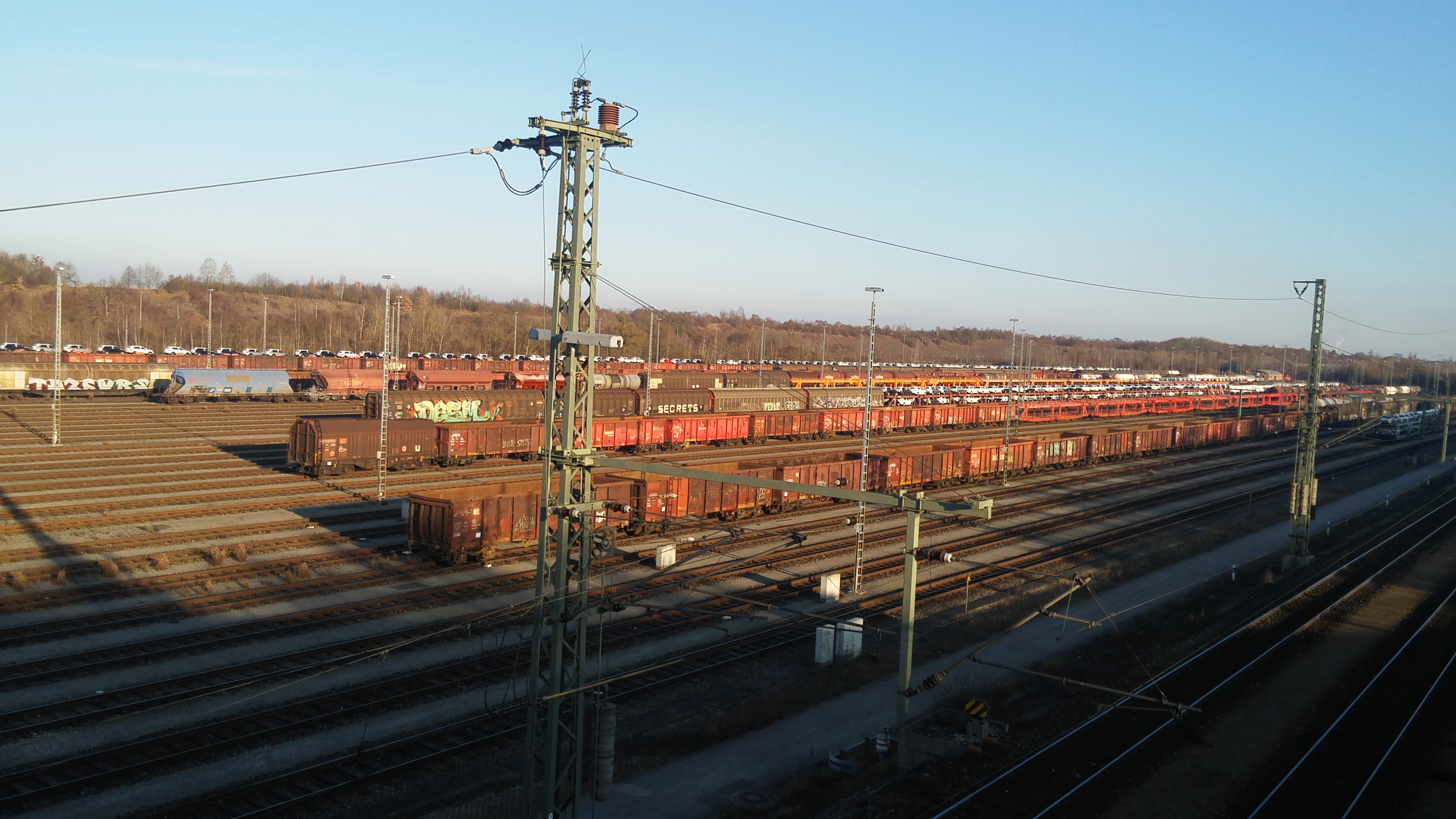
Rangierbahnhof

=== 11 – Milbertshofen-Am Hart ===
Harthof and Am Hart: Panzerwiese and Nordhaide settlement, Harthof elementary school and kindergarten, Versöhnungskirche (Church of Reconciliation), St. Gertrud, former US-American settlement, Ernst-von-Bergmann-Kaserne, Neuherberge settlement, Kaltherberge settlement, Am Hart settlement, Milbertshofen Jewish camp

Milbertshofen: Alte St.-Georgs-Kirche, Josefine and Michael Neumark, Neue St.-Georgs-Kirche, Milbertshofen Cultural Centre, Curt-Mezger-Platz, Dankeskirche, MilbenzentrumMite Centre), Elementary School at Schleißheimer Straße 275, Austria Tabak, Vulkanisiermaschinenfabrik Zängl/Kulturpark München, TSV Milbertshofen, Lion Feuchtwanger Gymnasium, Generation Garden in Petuelpark, Bayerische Motoren Werke AG (BMW)

Olympic Village and Olympic Park: Knorr-Bremse AG, Former Oberwiesenfeld Airport, Olympic Village, Olympiapark and Olympic sports facilities, Olympiaturm.

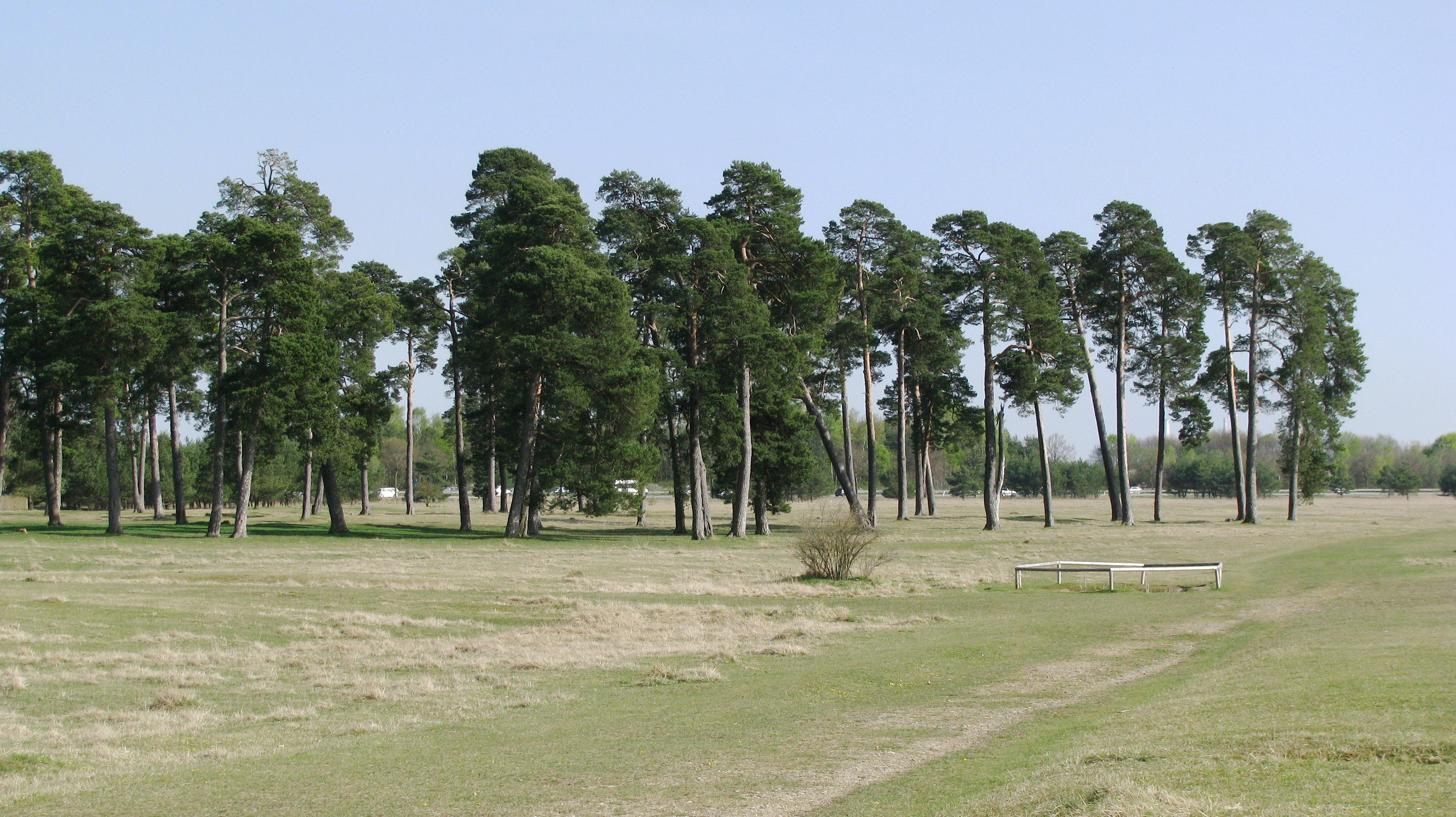
Panzerwiese

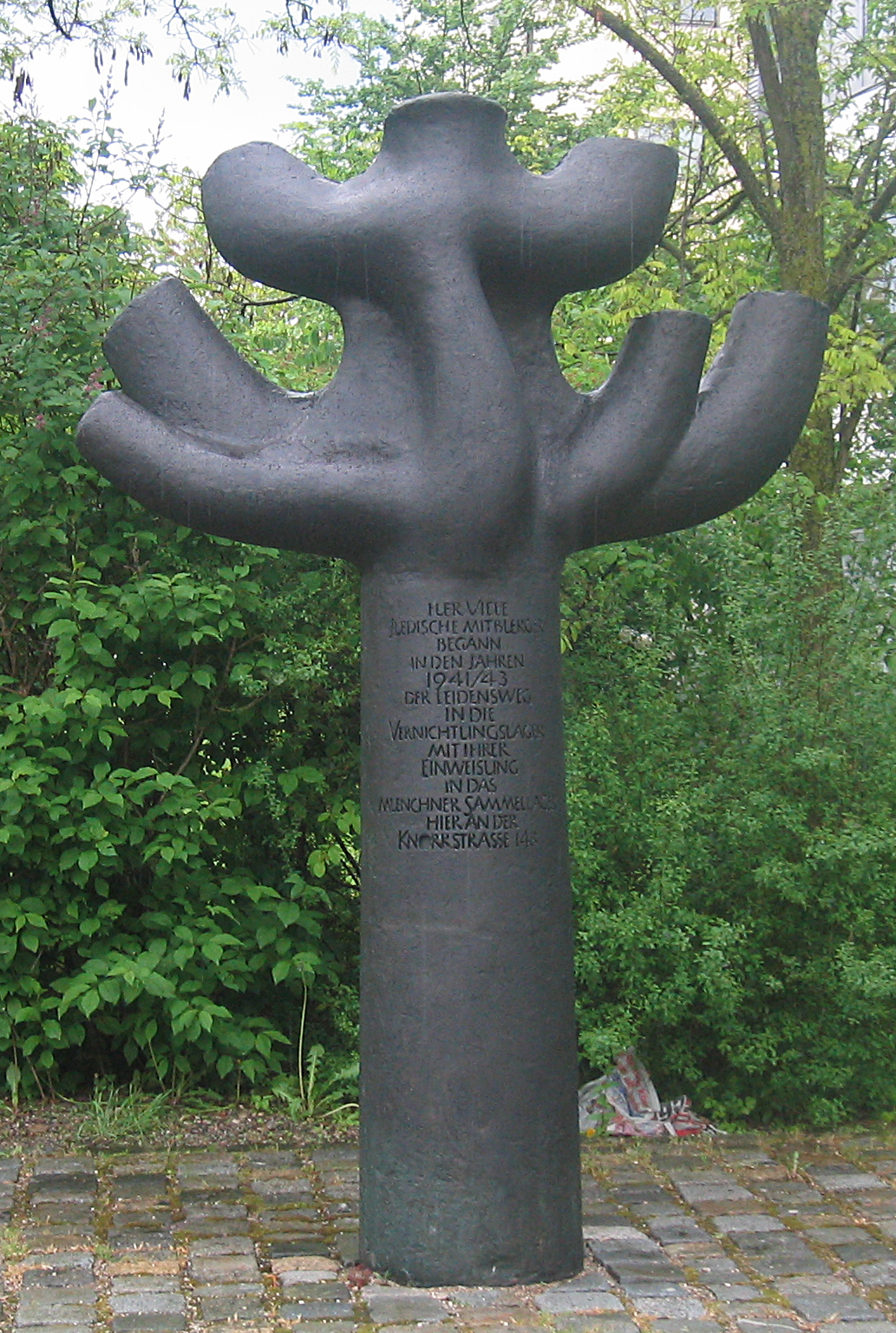
Monument

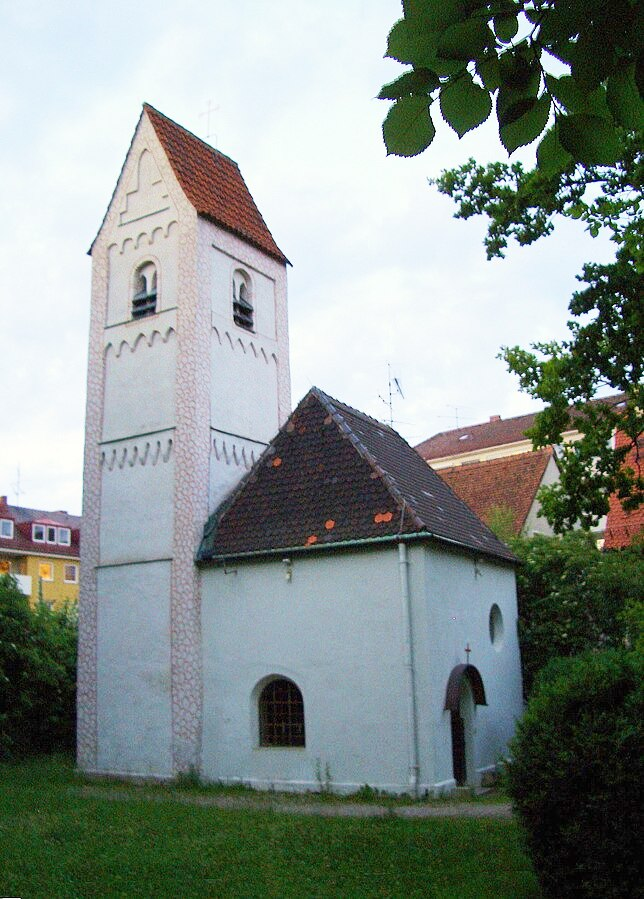
Alte St. Georgs-Kirche

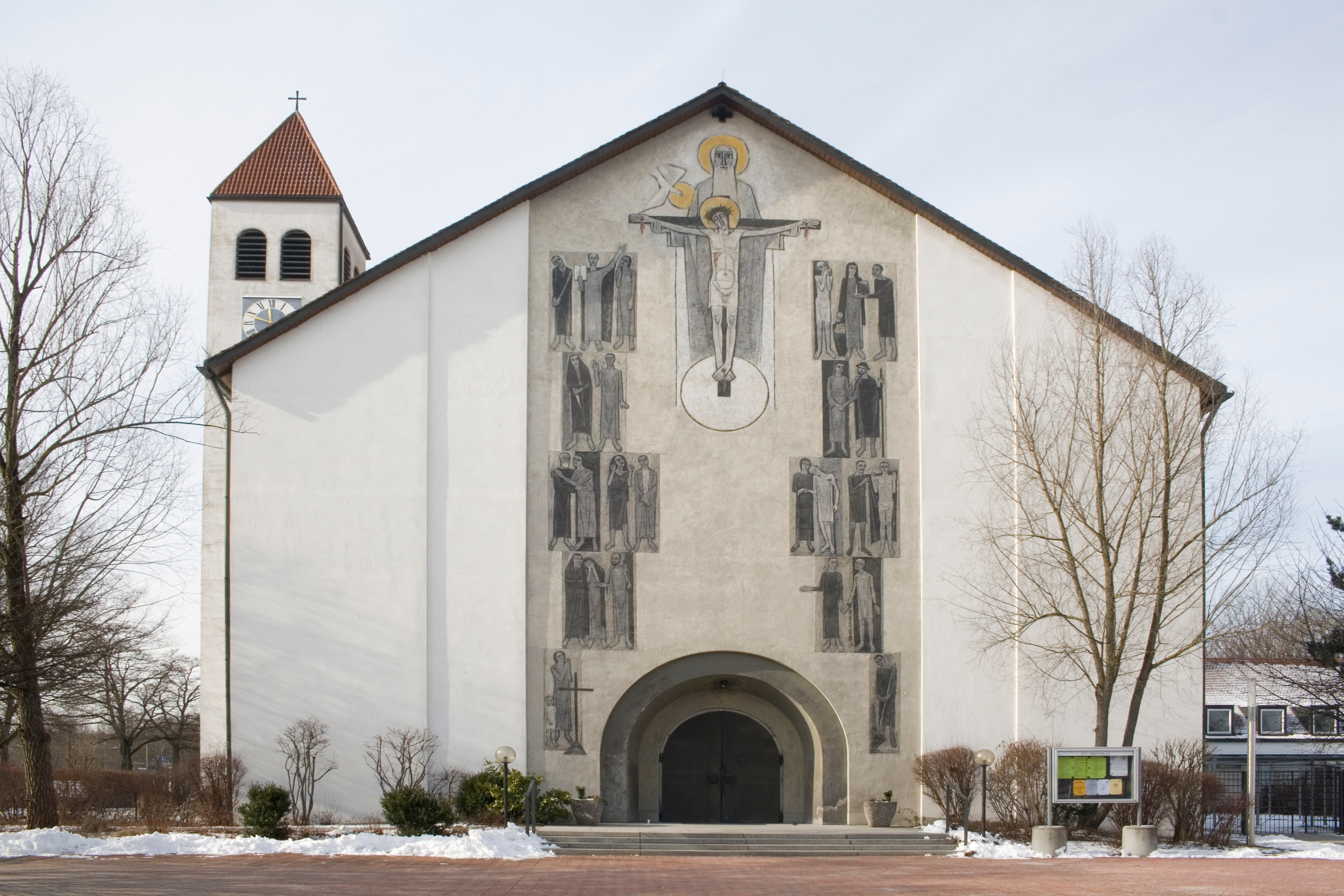
St. Gertrud

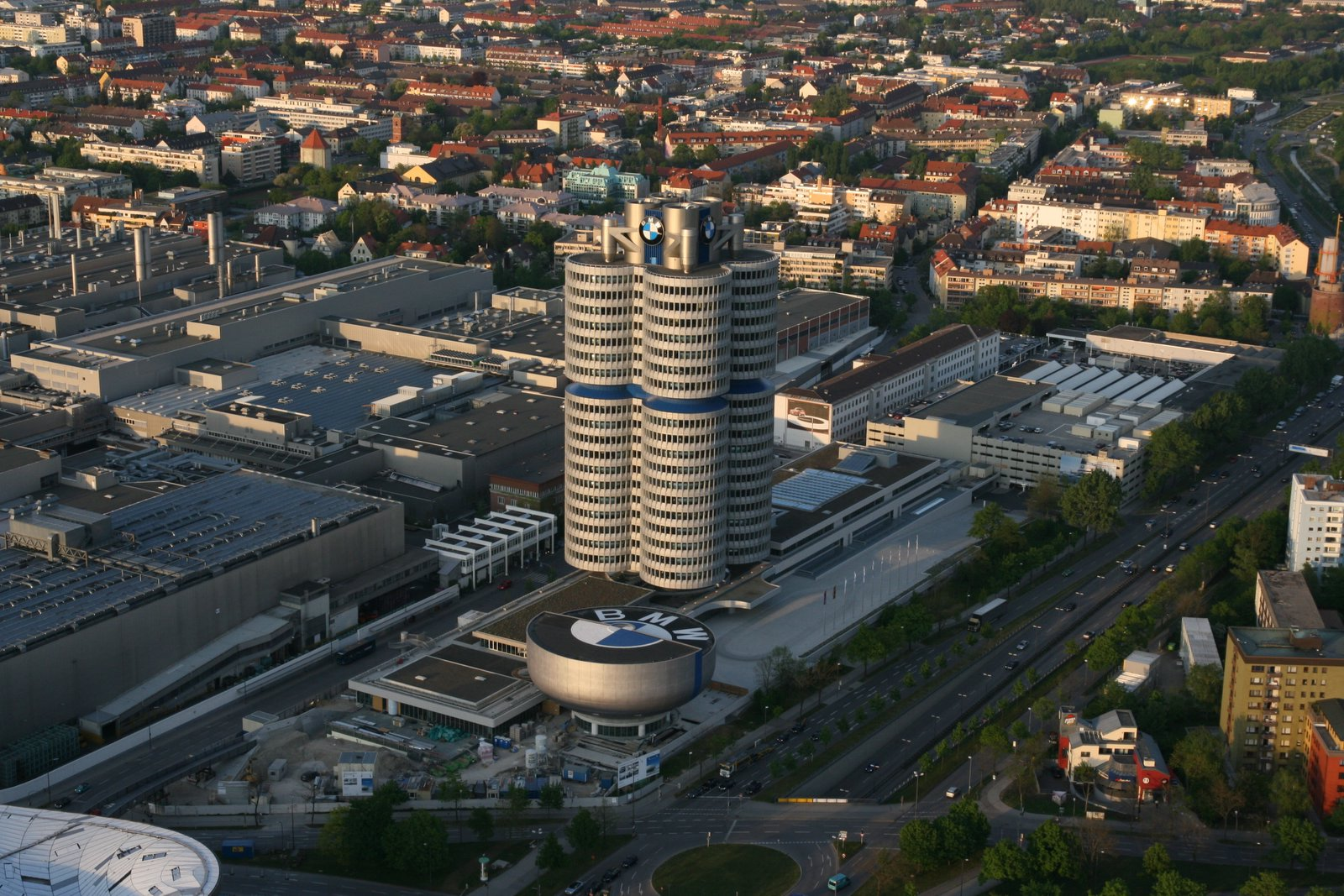
BMW

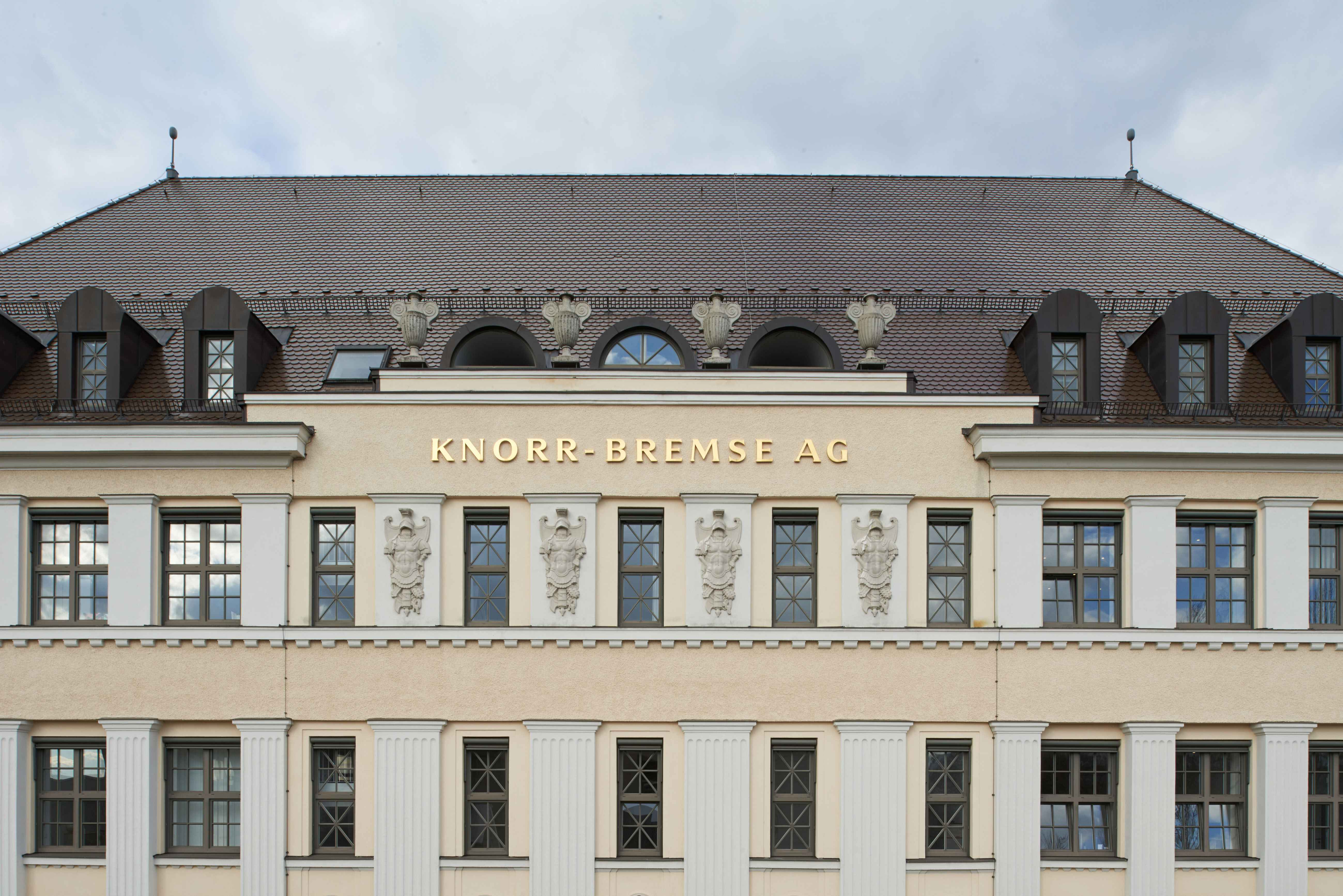
Knorr-Bremse AG

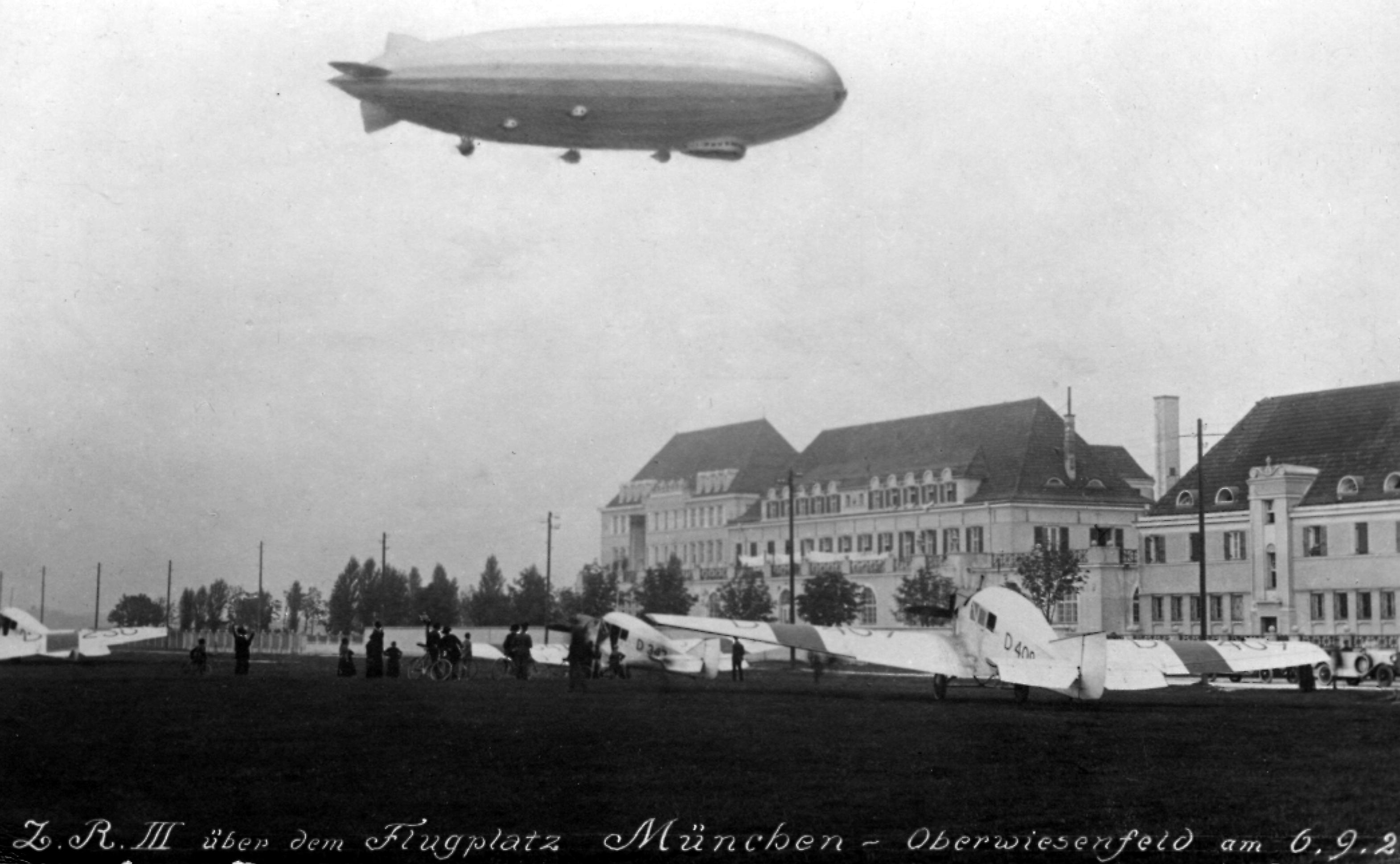
Former Oberwiesenfeld Airport

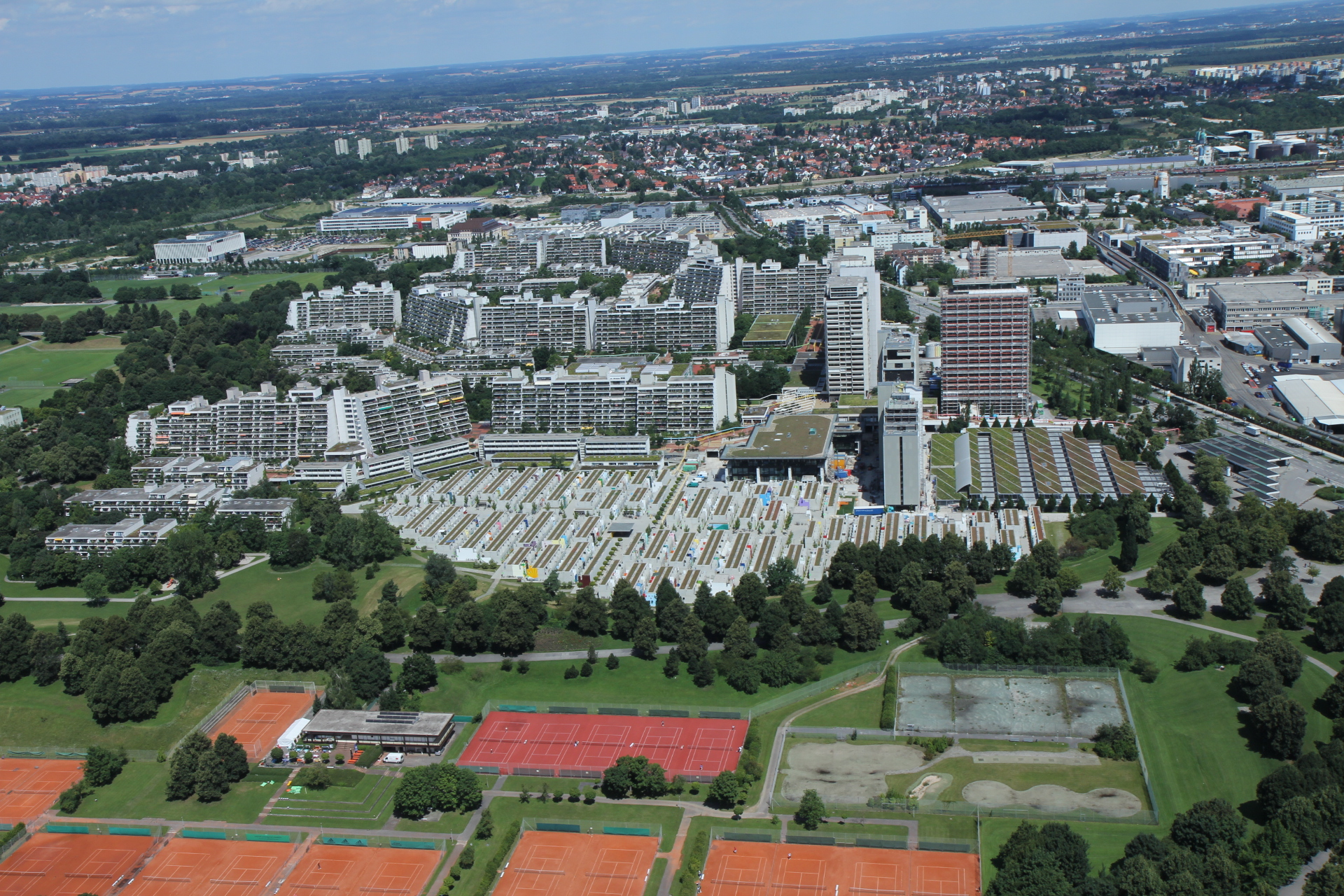
View from Olympiaturm

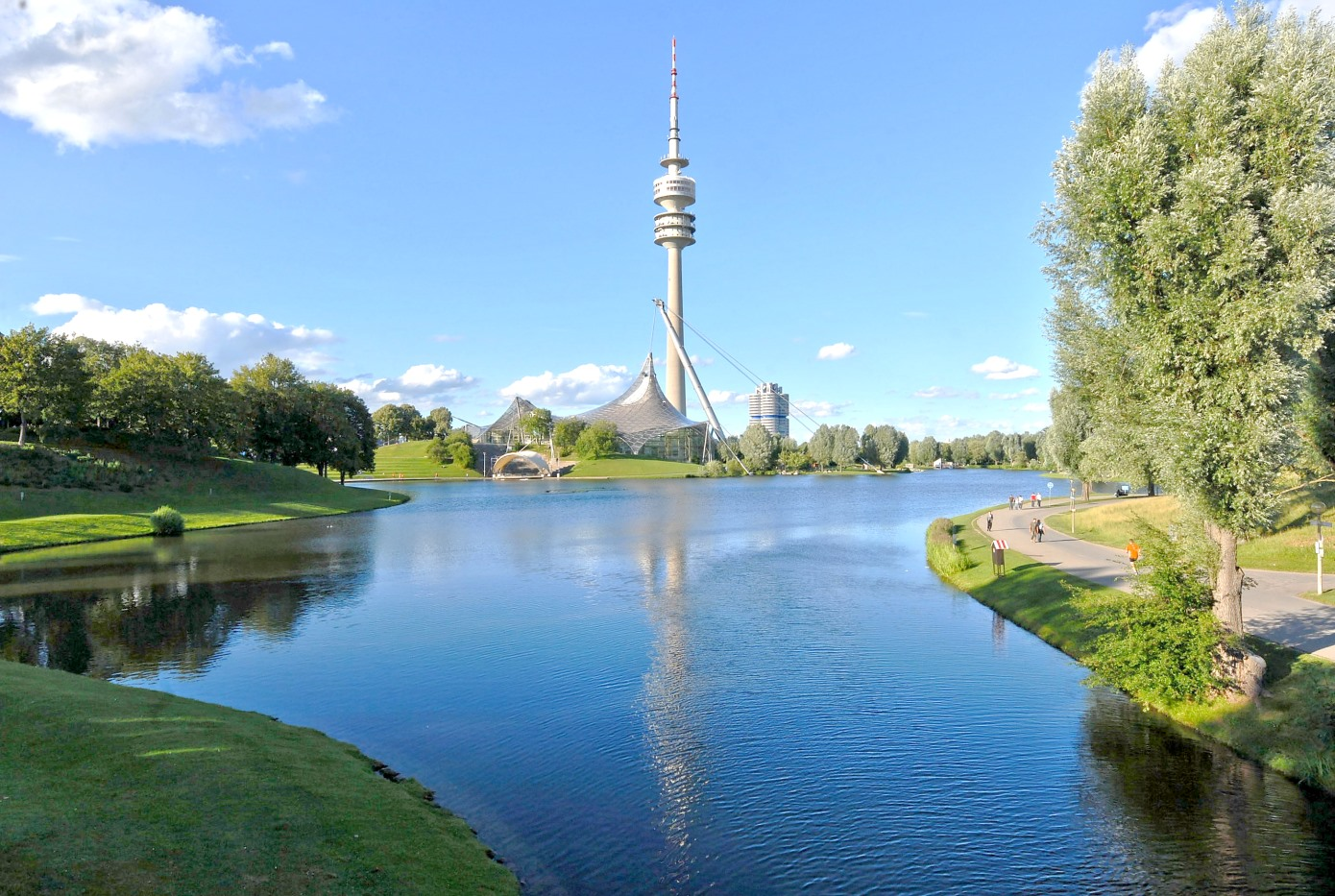
Olympiapark

=== 12 – Schwabing-Freimann ===
From Siegestor to Wahnmoching - a tour through the Schwabing of bohemianism, art and education: Siegestor, Franziska Gräfin zu Reventlow, Der Blaue Reiter, Der Simplicissimus, Leopoldpark, Die Malschule, Die Manns.

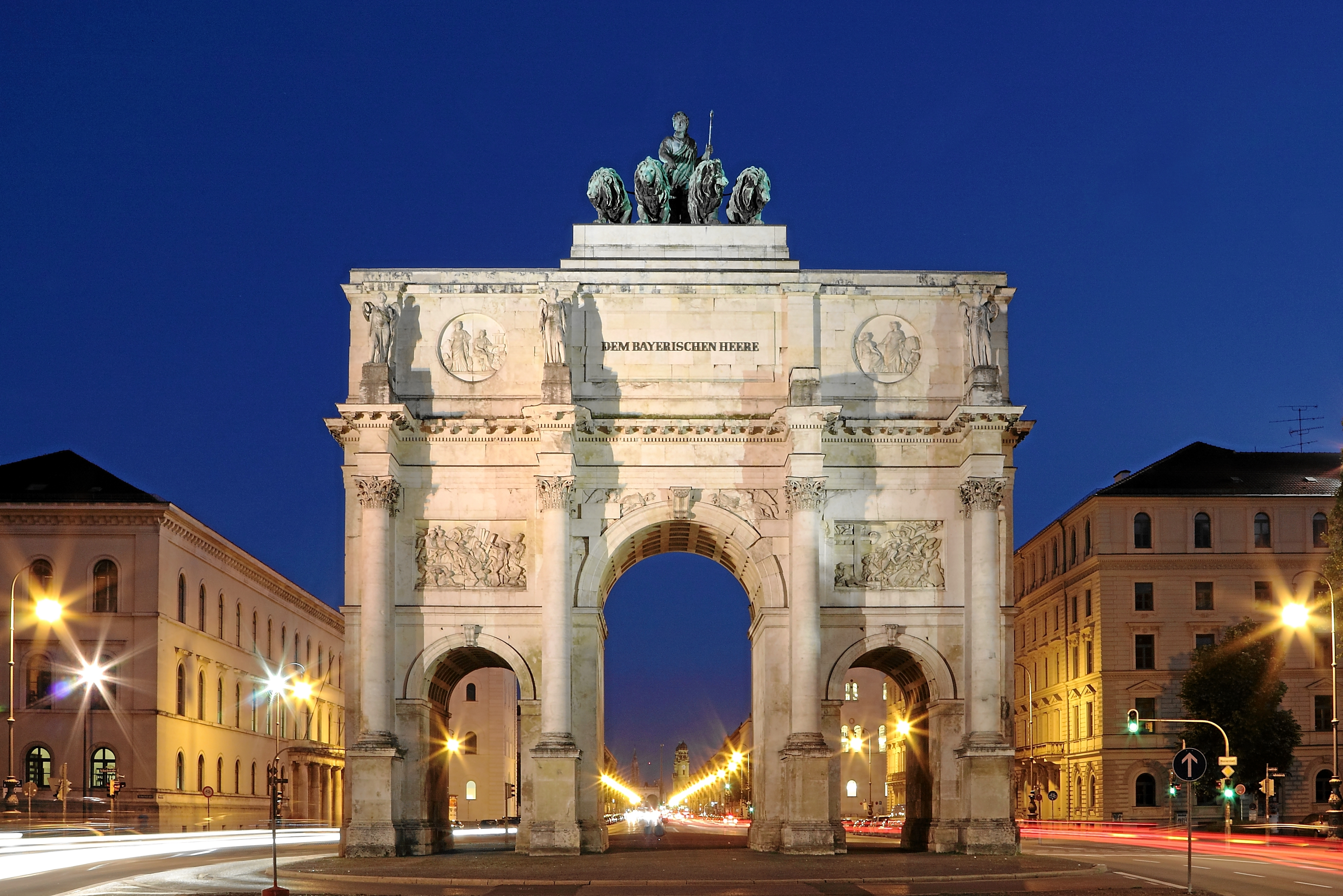
Siegestor

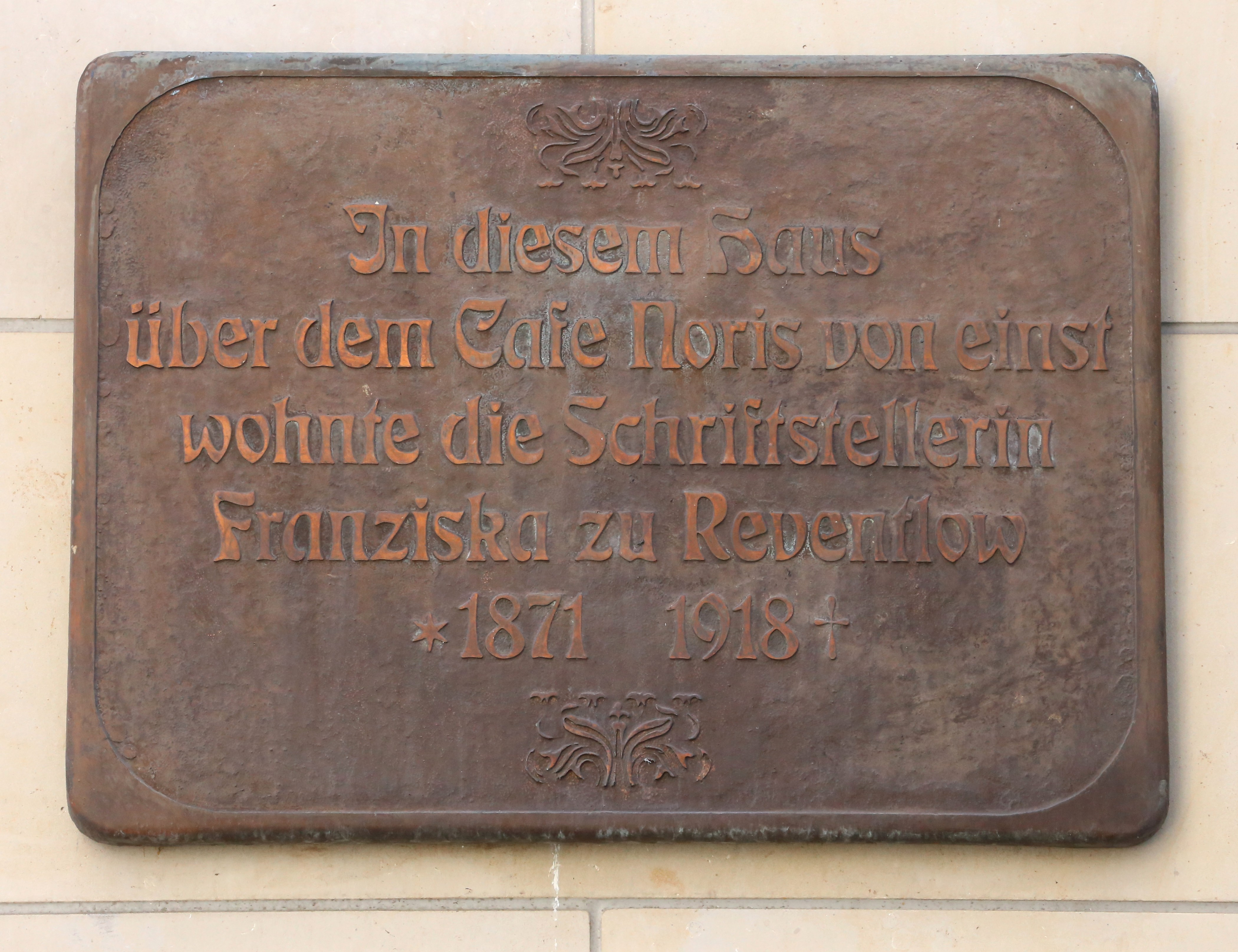
Memorial plaque
Franziska zu Reventlow

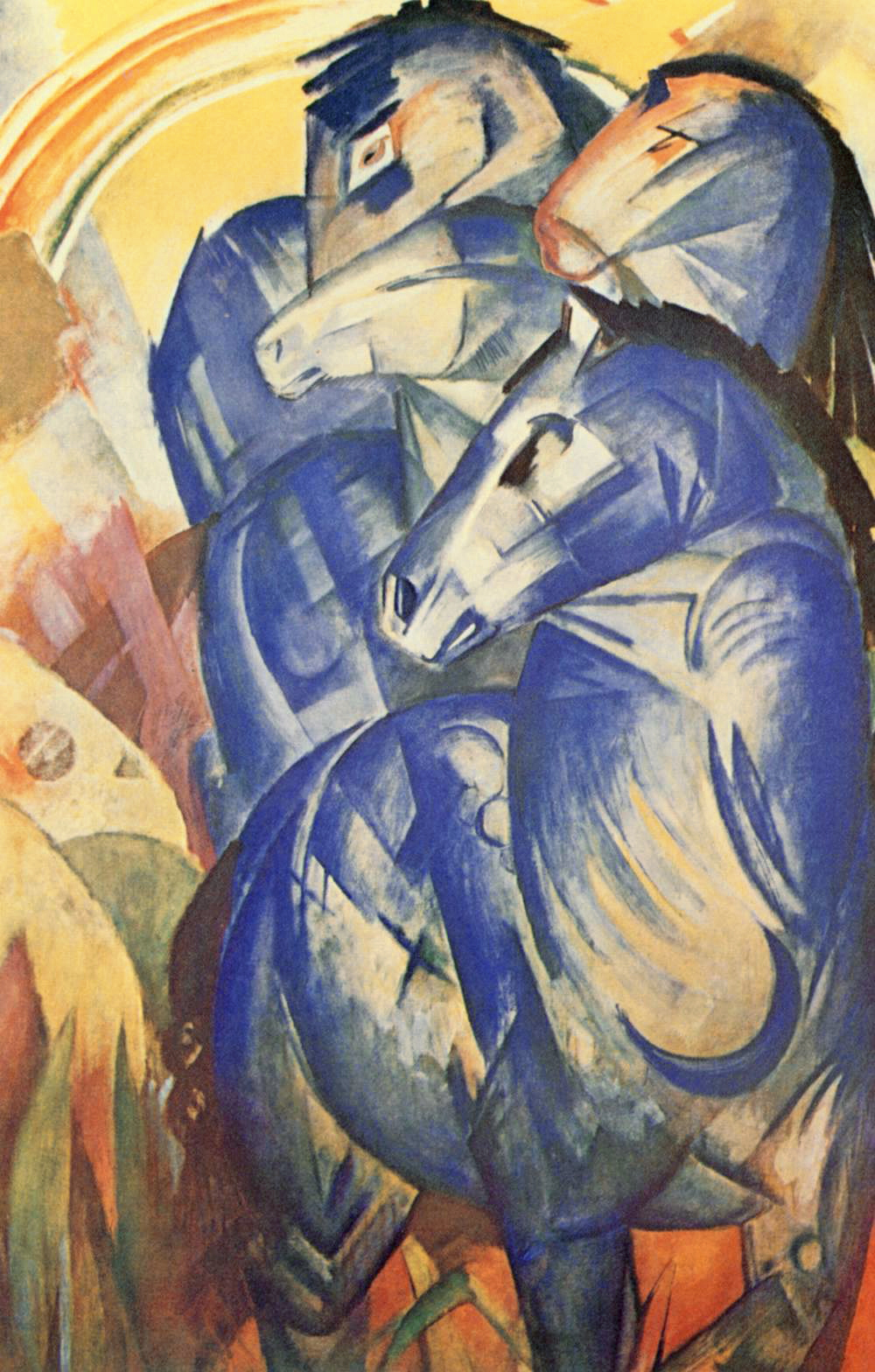
Franz Marc

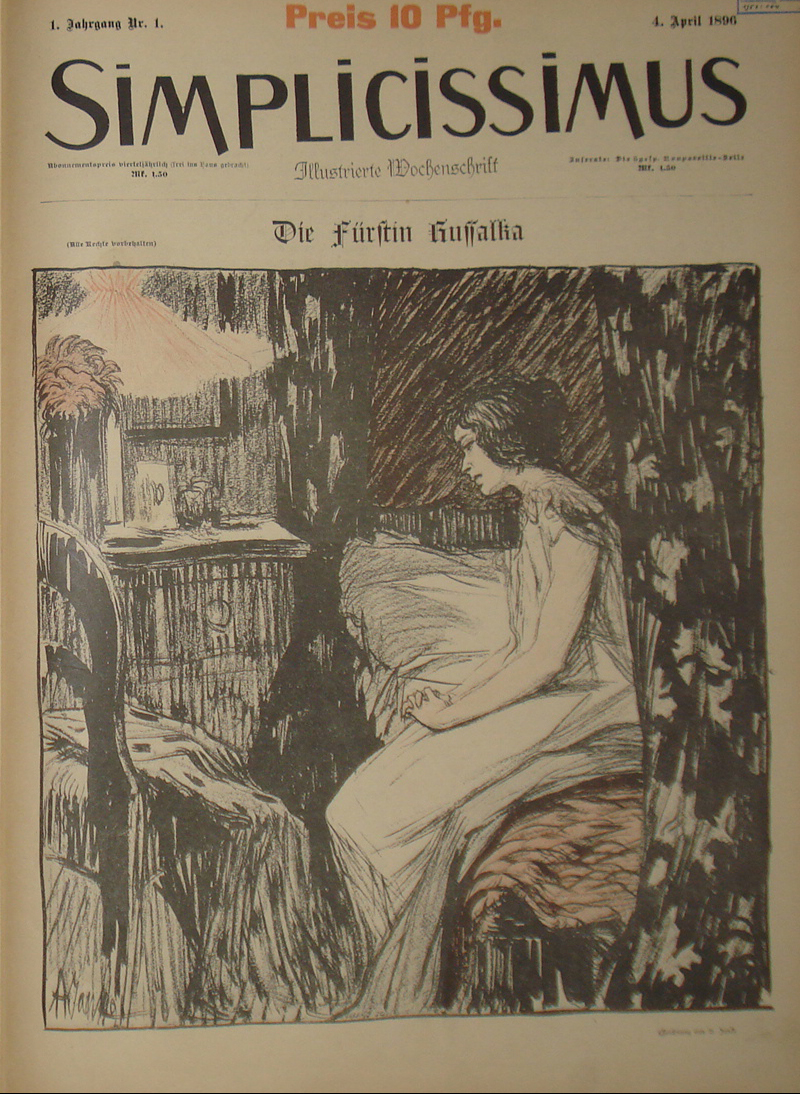
Simplicissimus

All about Münchner Freiheit - a tour of Old Schwabing: The White Rose, Trautenwolfstraße, Nikolaiplatz, Schloss Suresnes, Haimhauserstraße, St. Sylvester, Englischer Garten, Artur-Kutscher-Platz, Antonienheim, Erlöserkirche, Münchner Freiheit, St. Ursula,

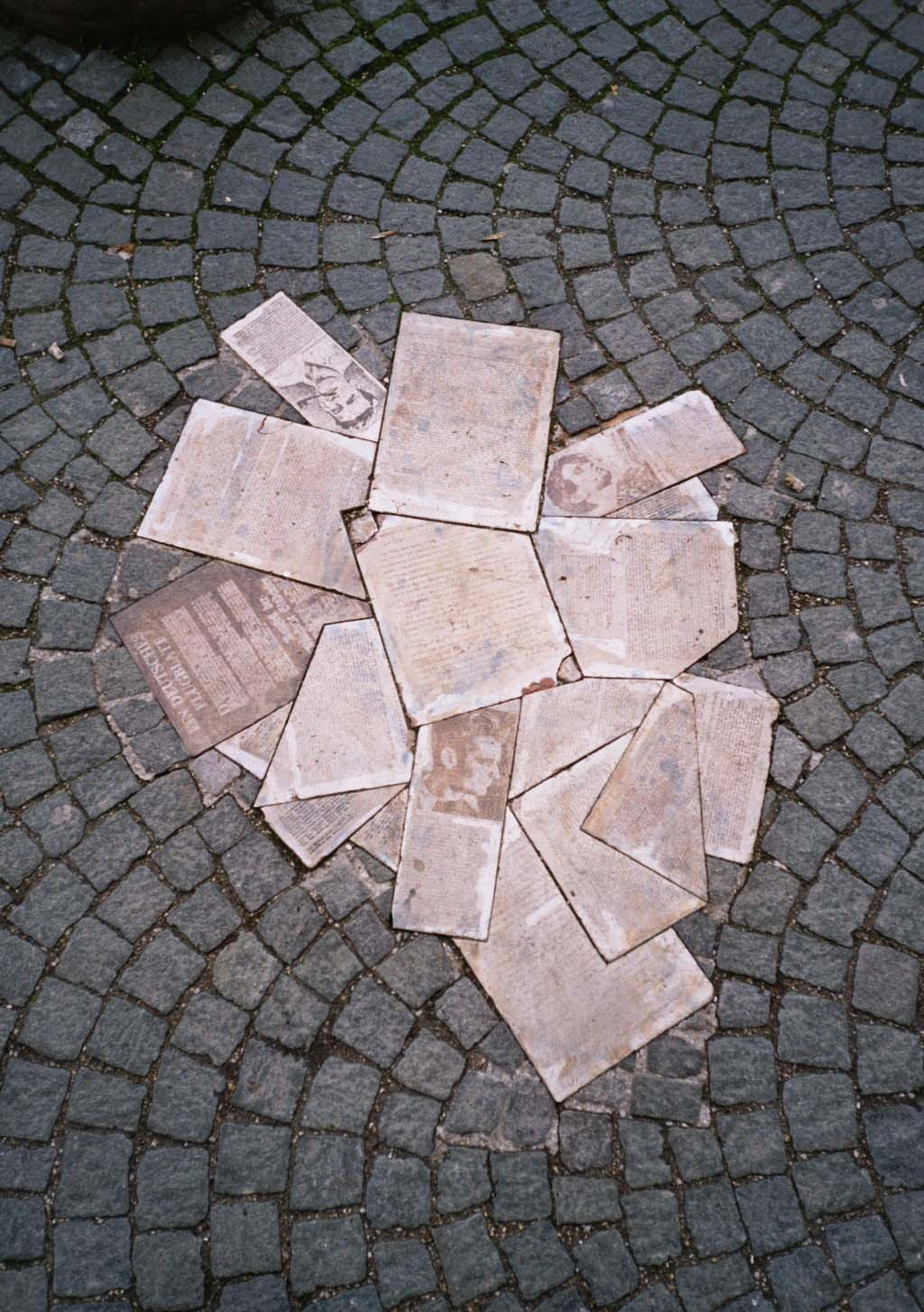
Weiße Rose

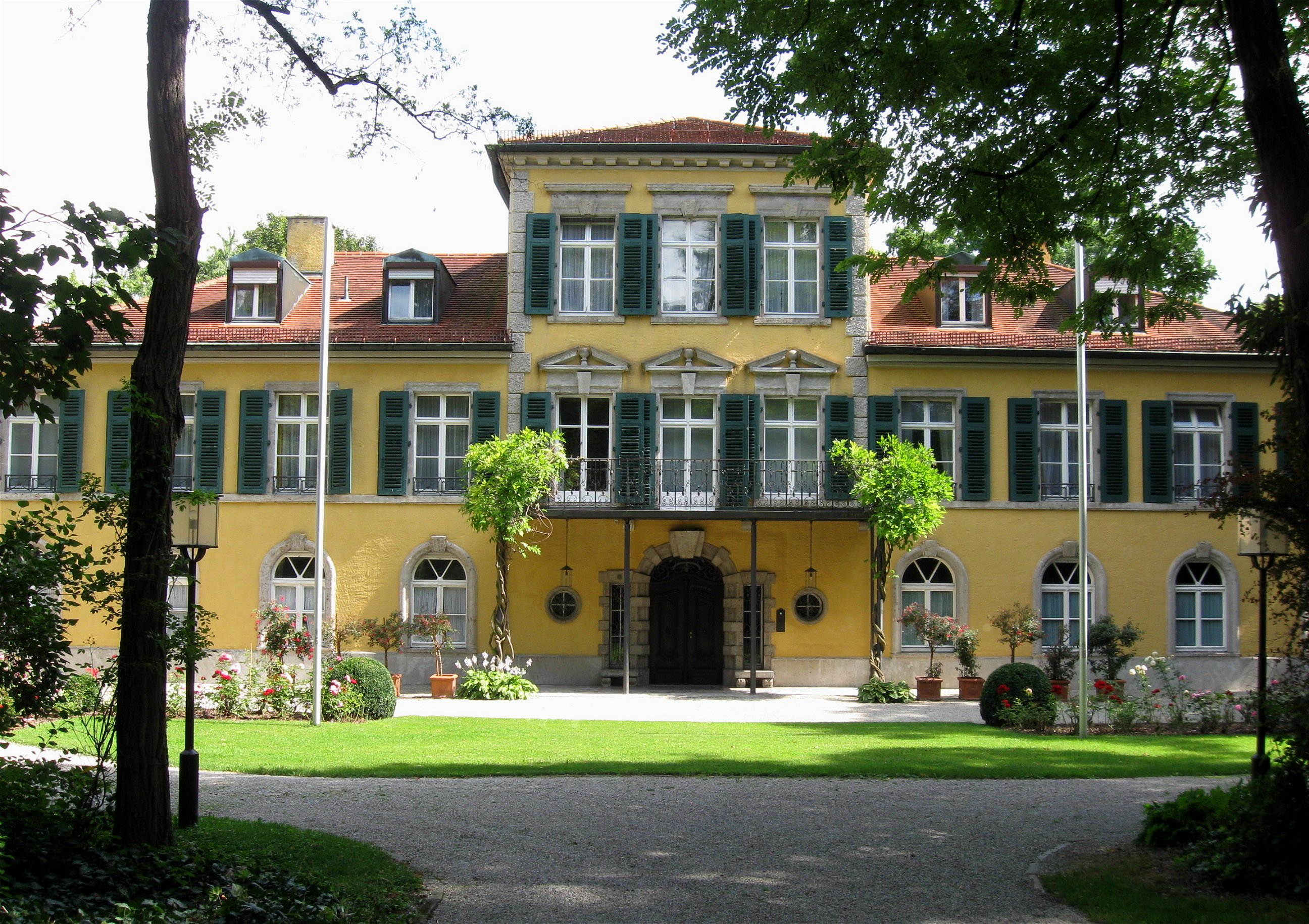
Schloss Suresnes

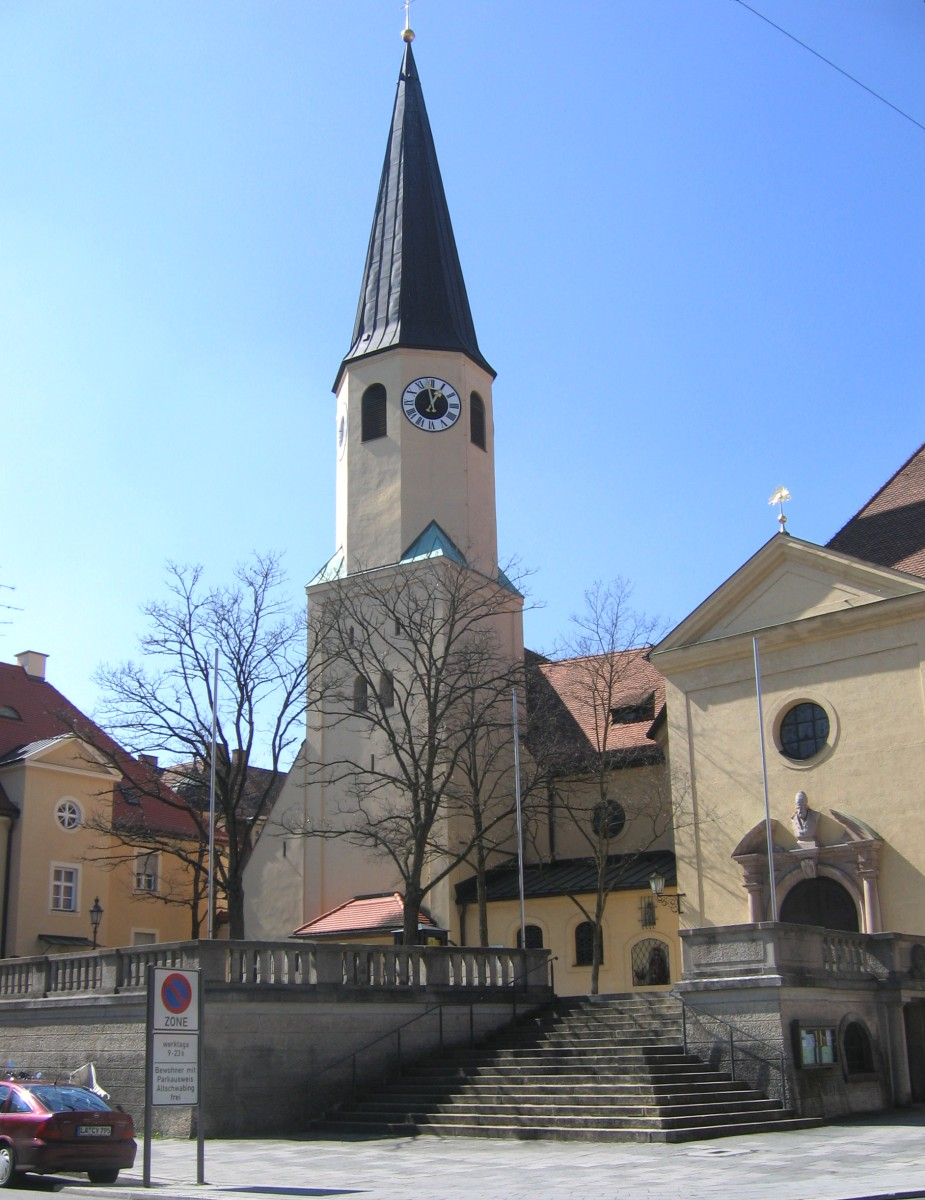
St. Sylvester

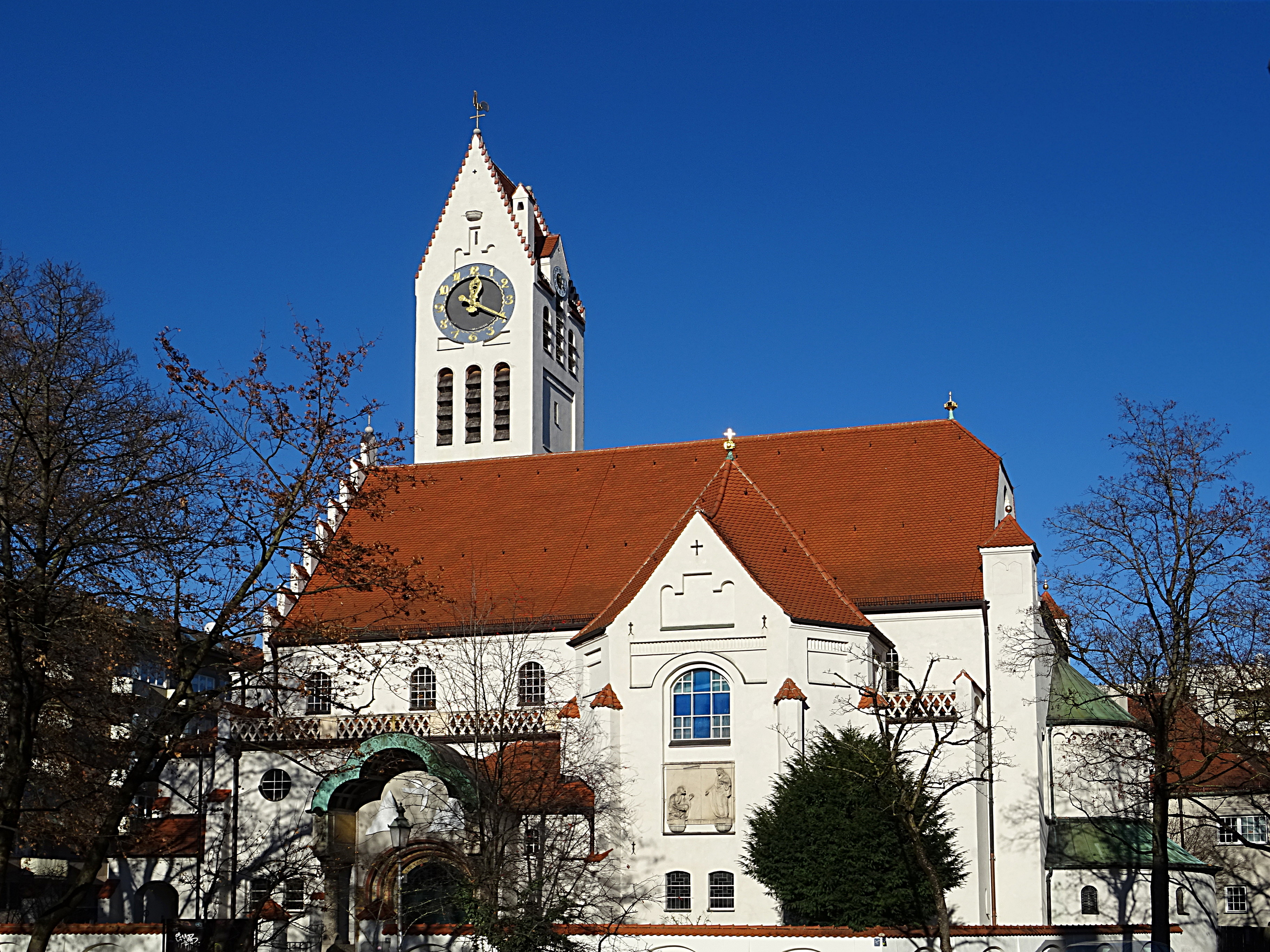
Erlöserkirche

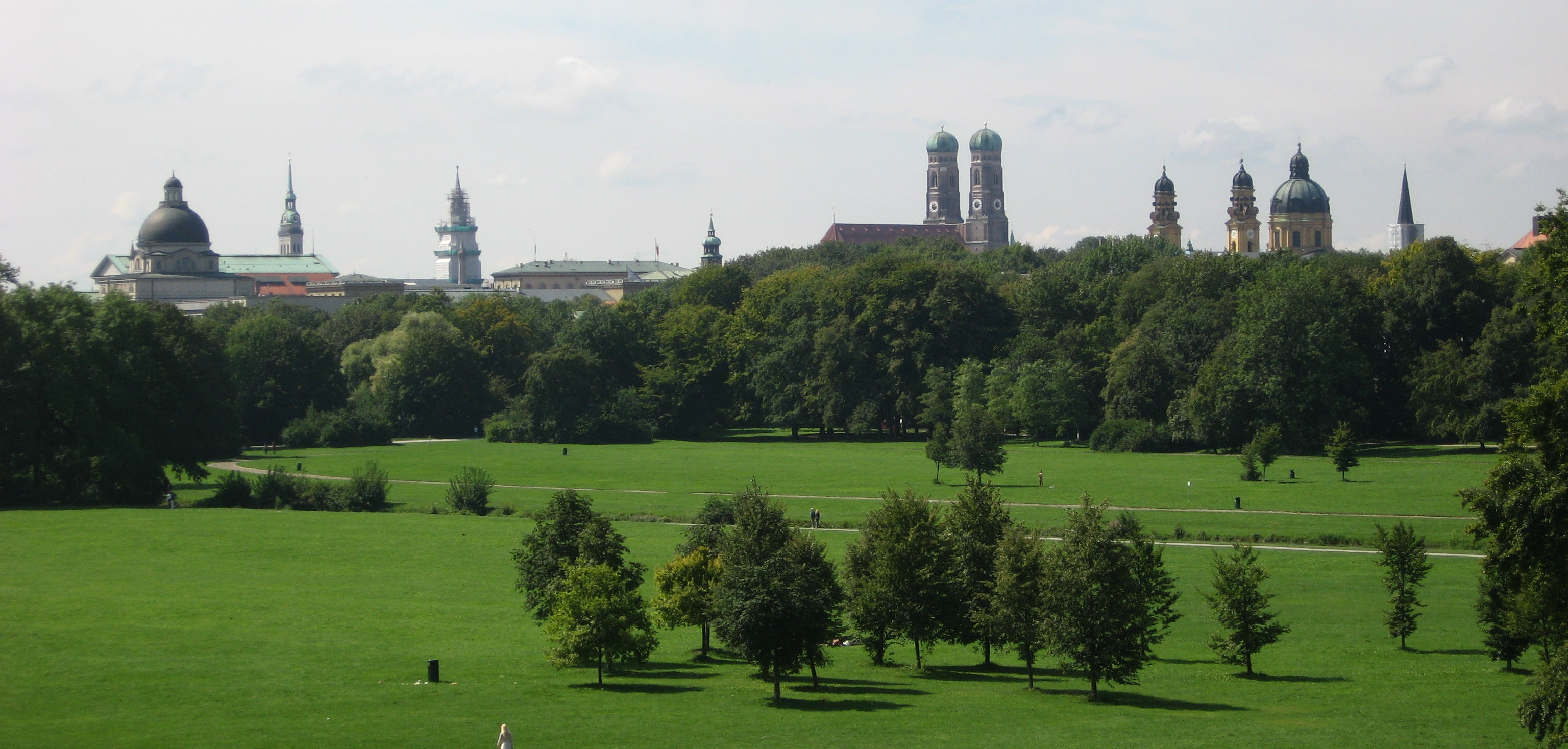
Englischer Garten

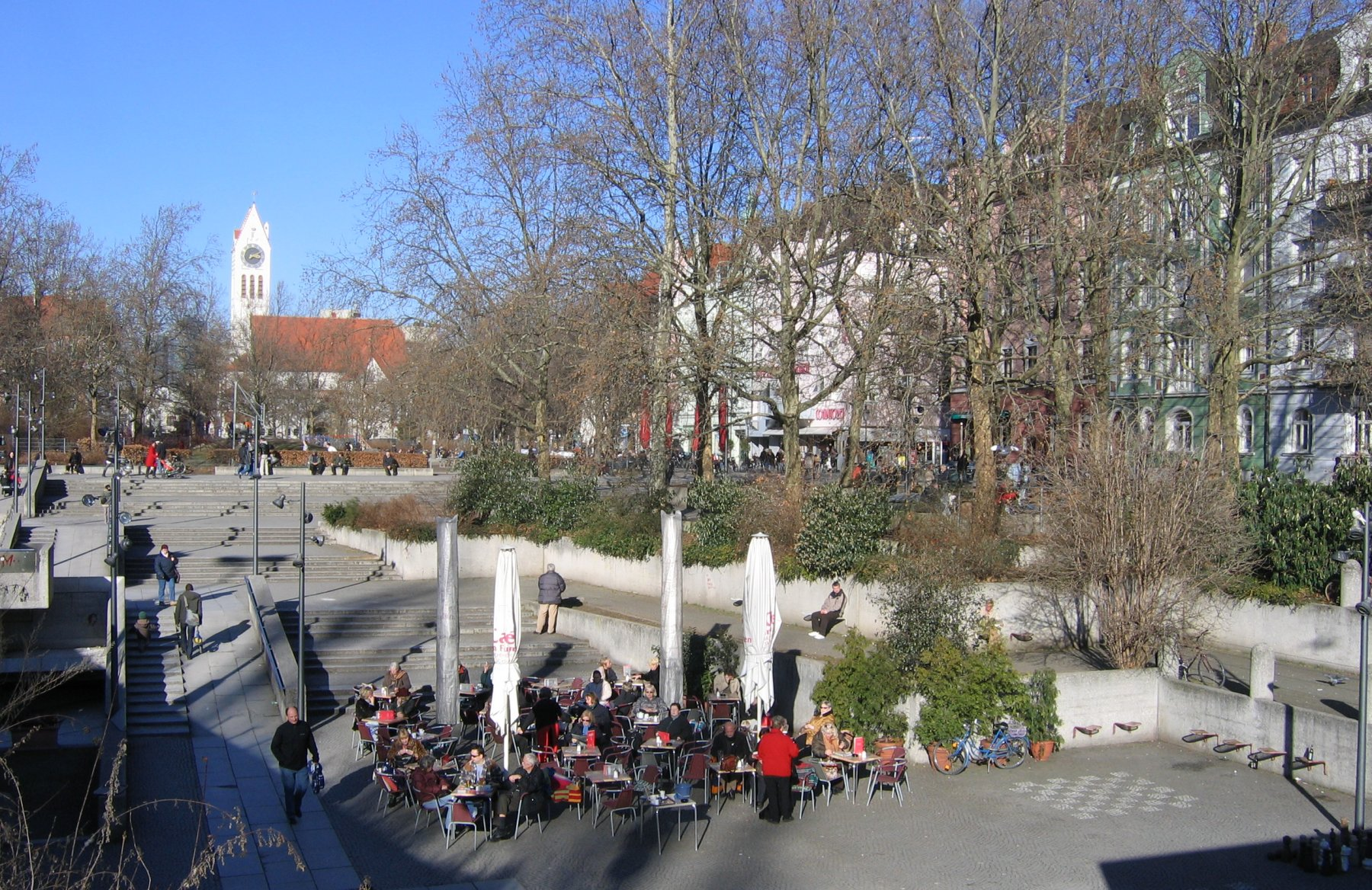
Münchner Freiheit

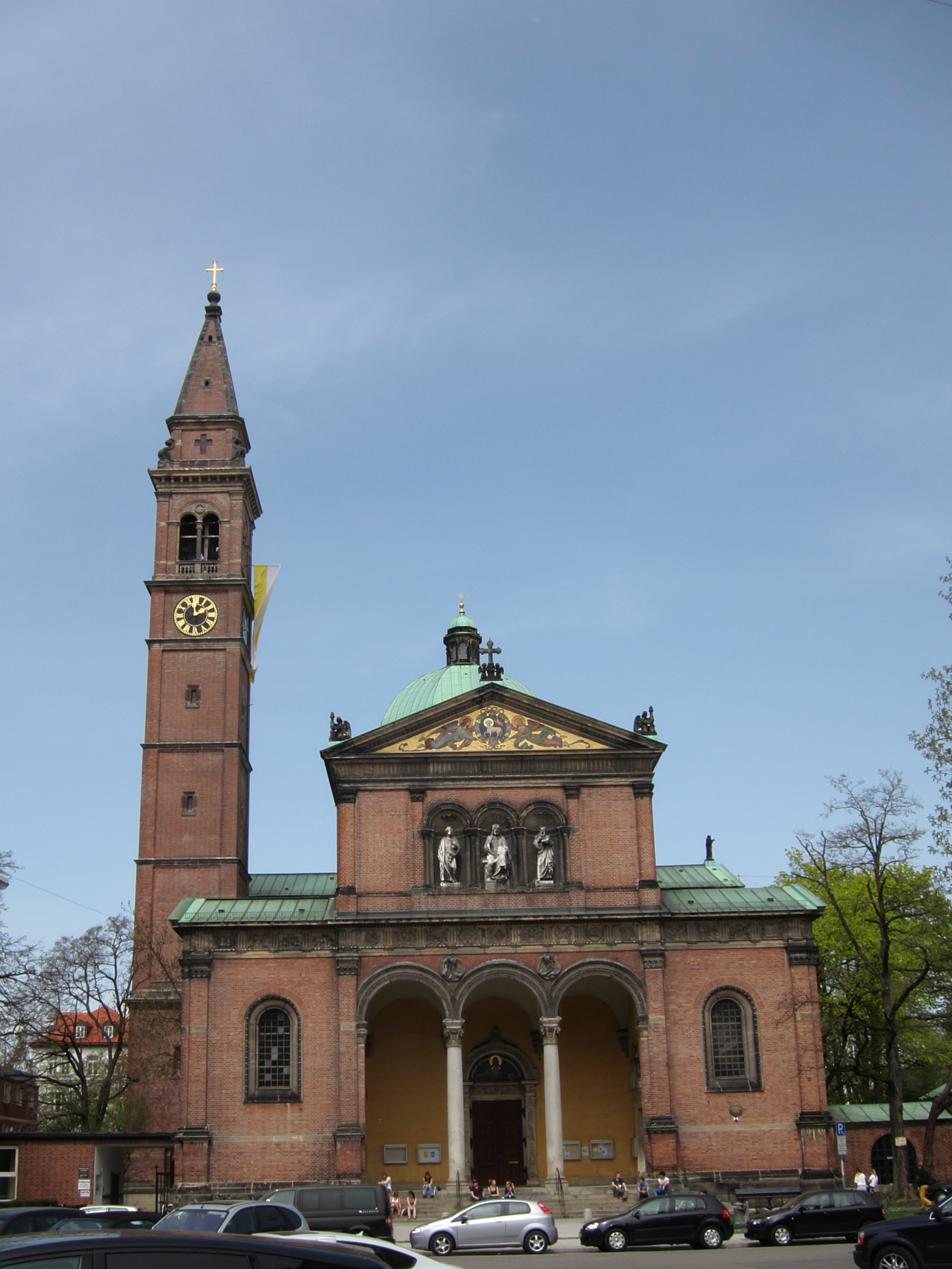
St. Ursula

Housing estates, disappeared villages and new life behind the mountain of rubbish - a cycle tour through North Schwabing and Freimann: Alte Heide, Parkstadt Schwabing, Nordfriedhof, Studentenstadt, Aumeister (restaurant), Sondermeierstraße, Alt-Freimann, Mohr-Villa, Ausbesserungswerk München-Freimann (Repair Works), pine garden, Reichskleinsiedlung Freimann (Small Settlement), Großlappen, Auensiedlung (floodplain settlement), Fröttmaning, Allianz Arena.

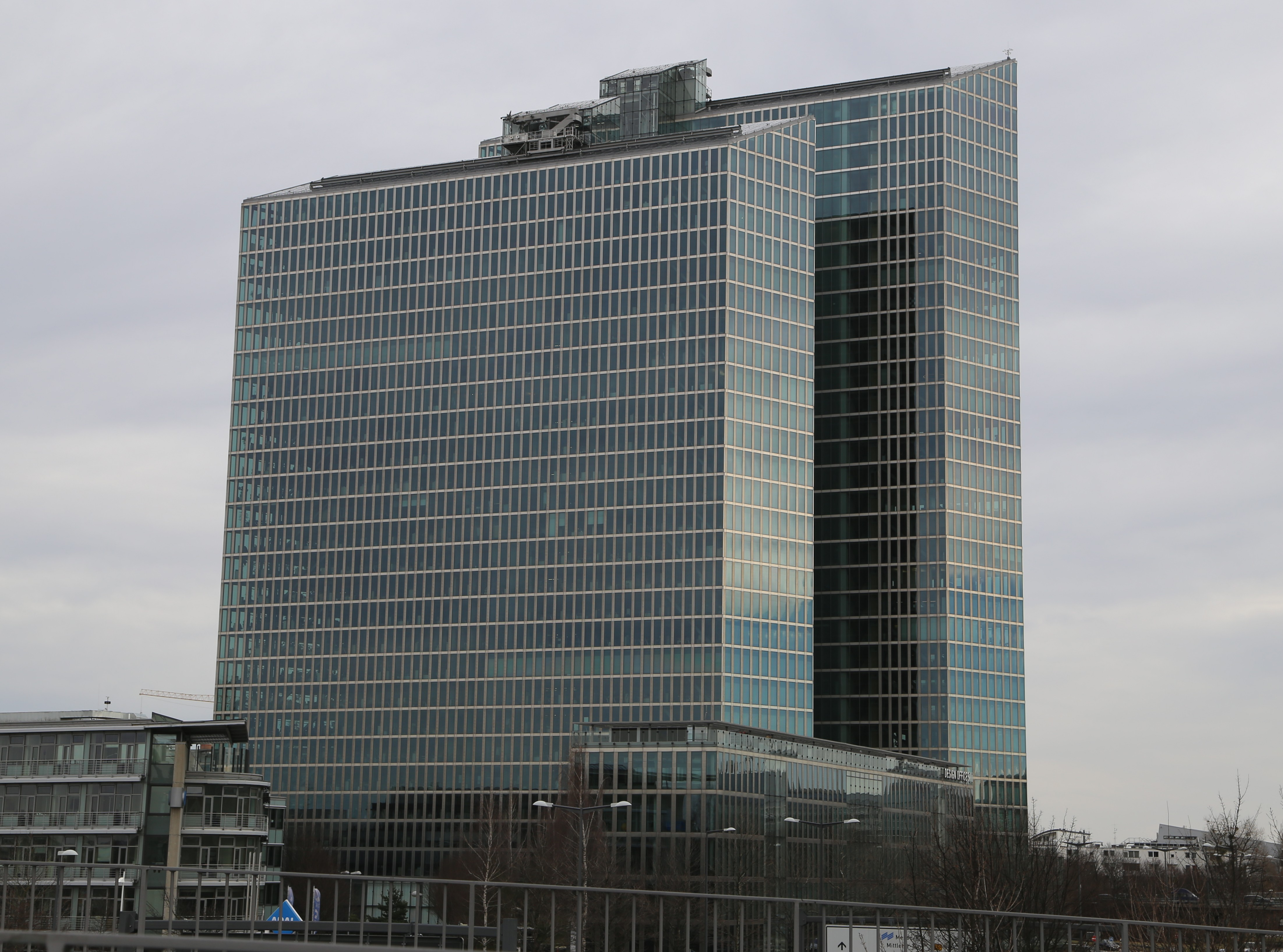
Parkstadt Schwabing:
Highlight Towers

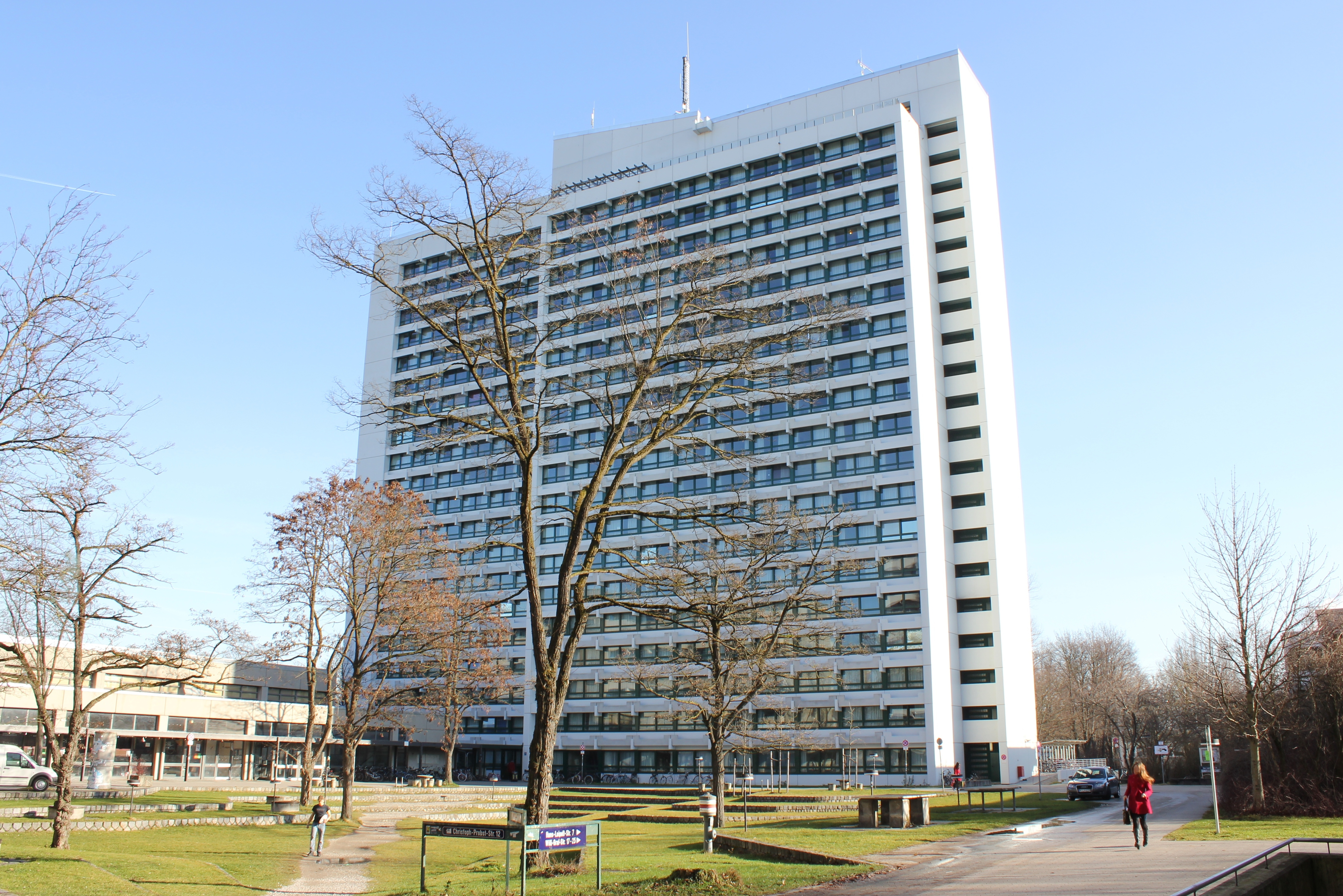
Studentenstadt

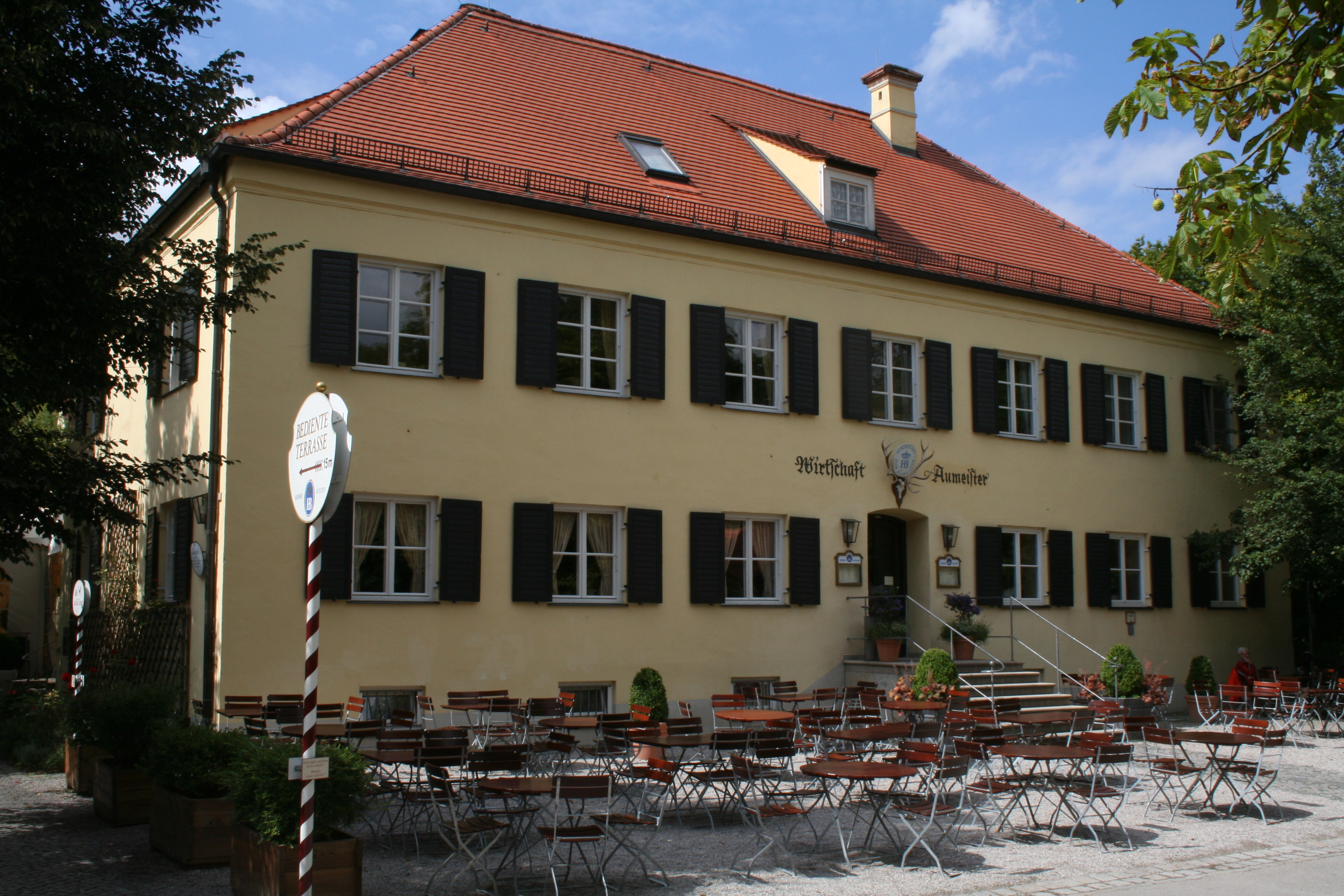
Aumeister

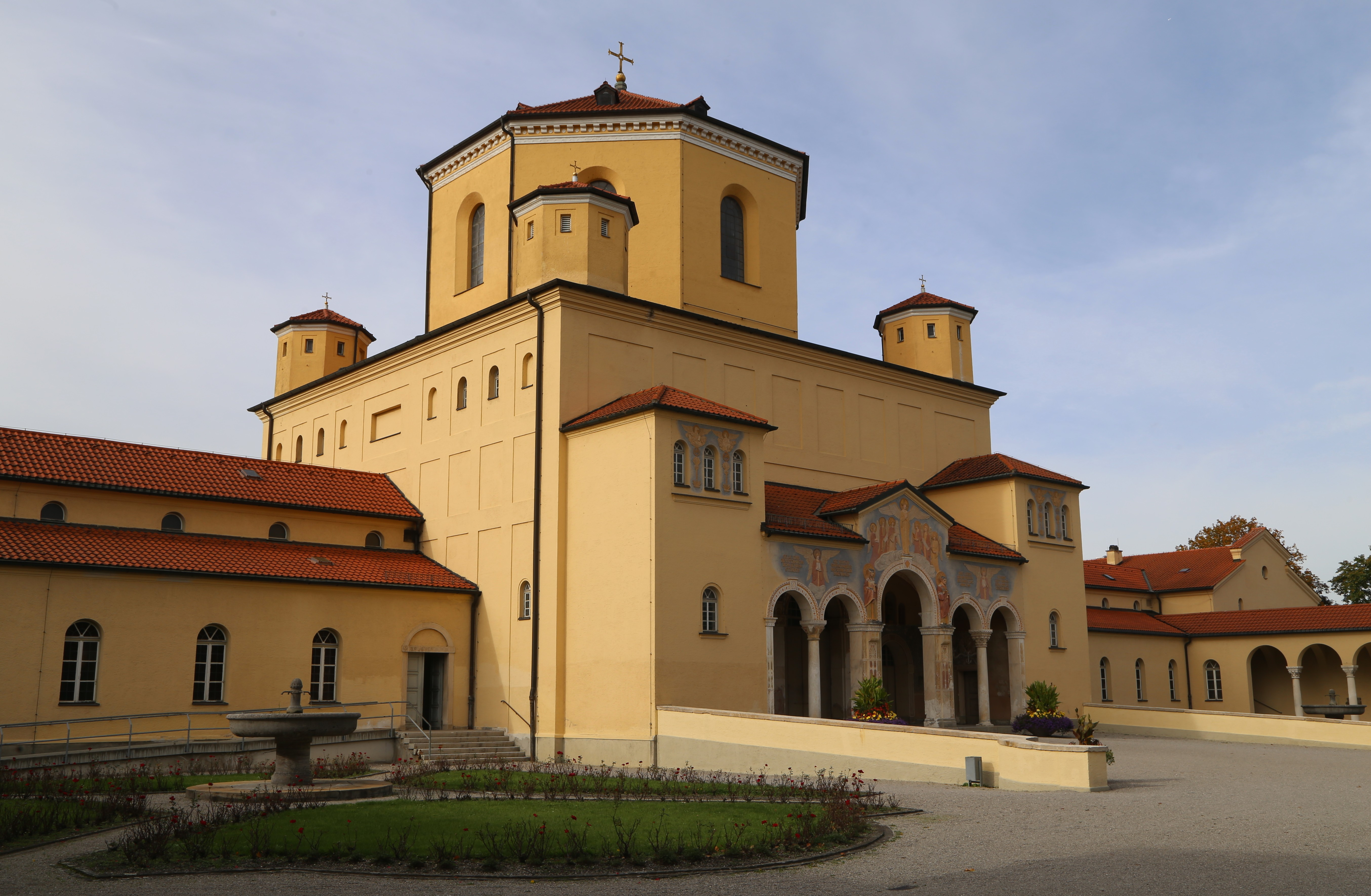
Nordfriedhof

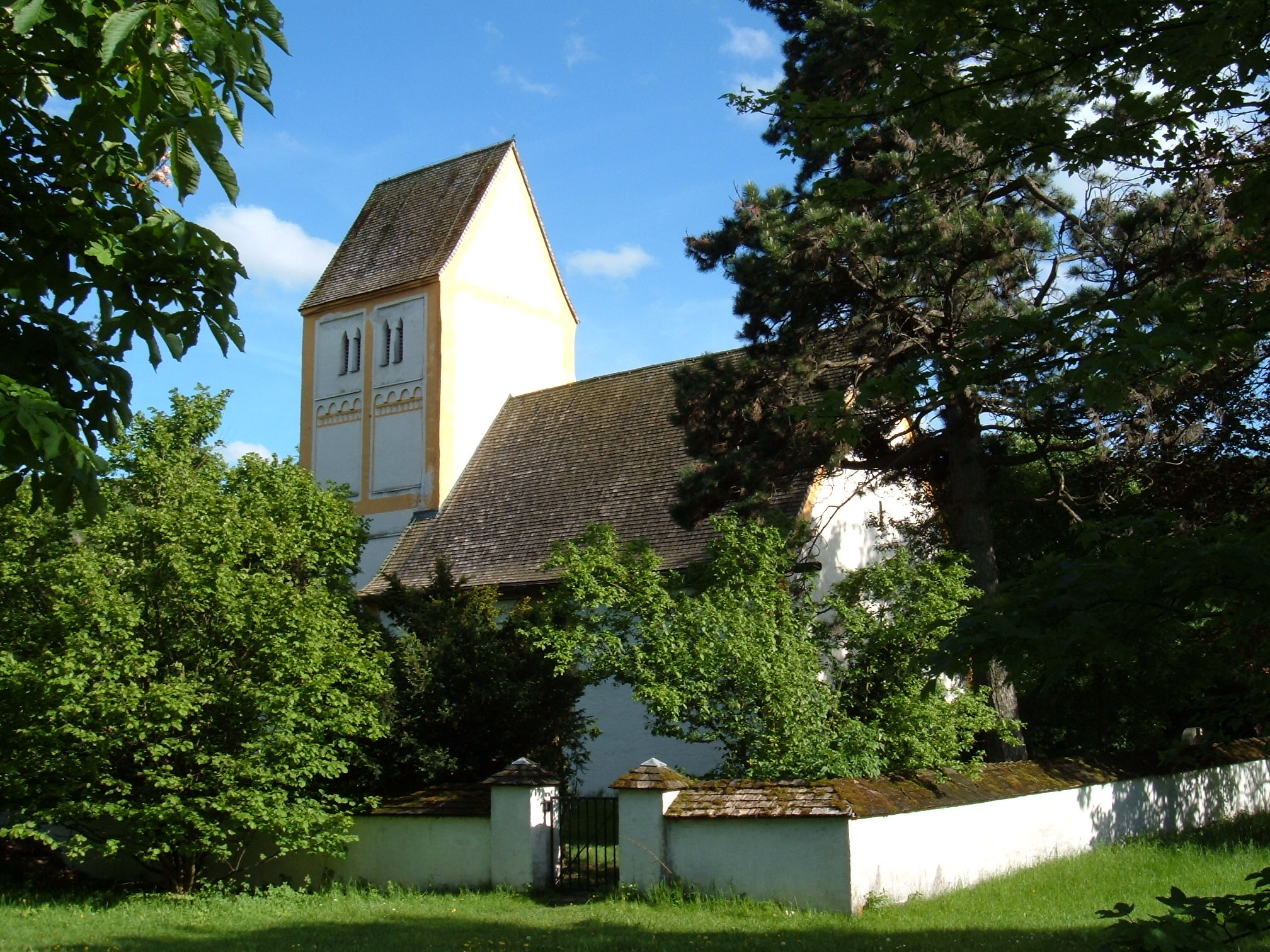
Fröttmaning

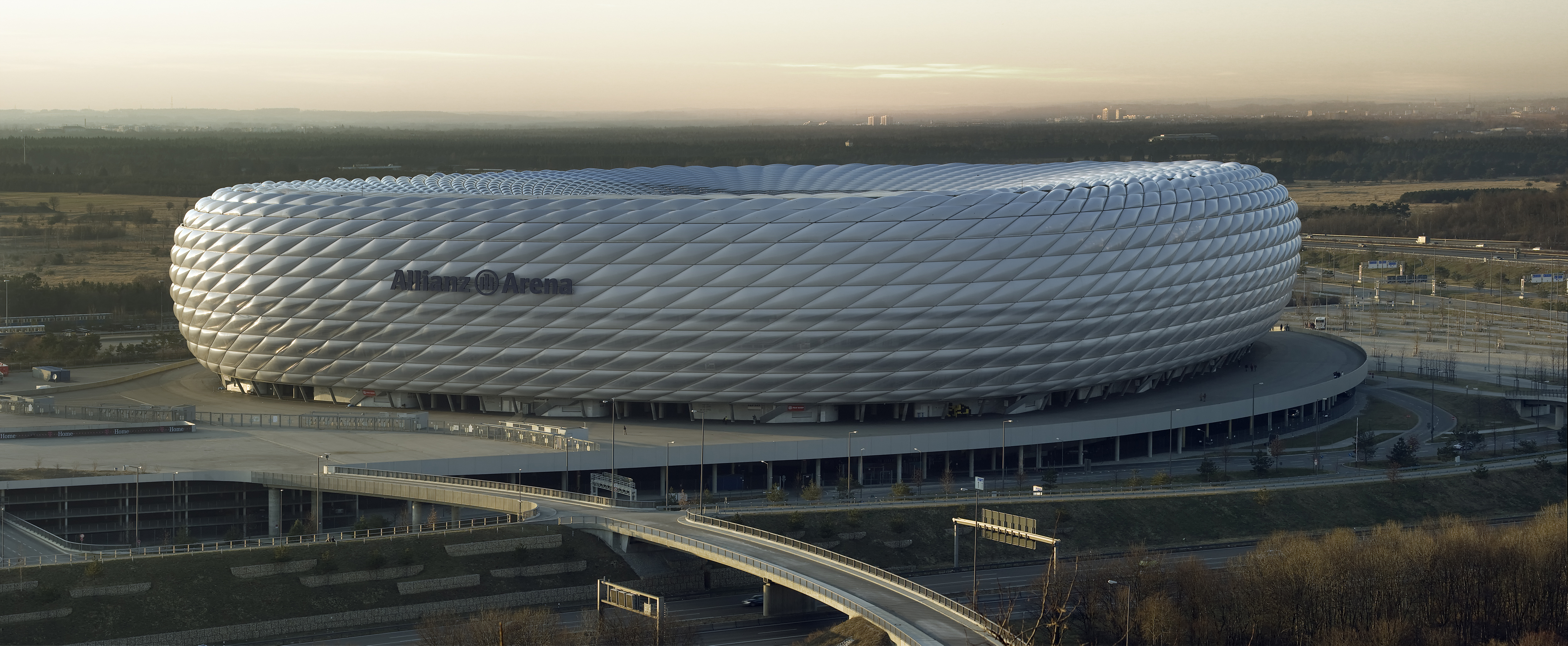
Allianz Arena

=== 13 – Bogenhausen ===
Walk from the Friedensengel to Mae West: Friedensengel, Hildebrandhaus/Monacensia (Literary Archives), Maria-Theresia-Straße, Rudolf Diesel, former Schloss Neuberghausen/Beamtenreliktenanstalt, St. Georg and Bogenhausener Friedhof, Lauer Villa, Georg Kerschensteiner, Richard Willstätter, Möhlstraße, Prinzregententheater, model buildings Neue Südstadt, former Upper Bavarian State Insurance Institution, former Betz/Togal-Werk restaurant, former noble seat Stepperg/Reichsfinanzhof, university observatory, Max-Josef-Stift, Parkstadt Bogenhausen, Arabellapark.

From Herzogpark via St. Emmeram to Oberföhring: Mauerkircherstraße, Thomas Mann, former inn, Herzogpark, Erich Kästner, Grüntal, St. Emmeram, Oberföhring village centre, Bernheimer Schlösschen, brickworks, Oberföhring Bürgerpark, former Prinz-Eugen-Kaserne.

Cycle tour from Johanneskirchen via Daglfing, Zamdorf, Steinhausen and Denning to Englschalking: St. Johann Baptist, village centre of Daglfing, trotting track Daglfing, Zamilapark, Africa settlement, Hartl-/Theen villa, primary school on Ostpreußenstraße, St. Nikolaus

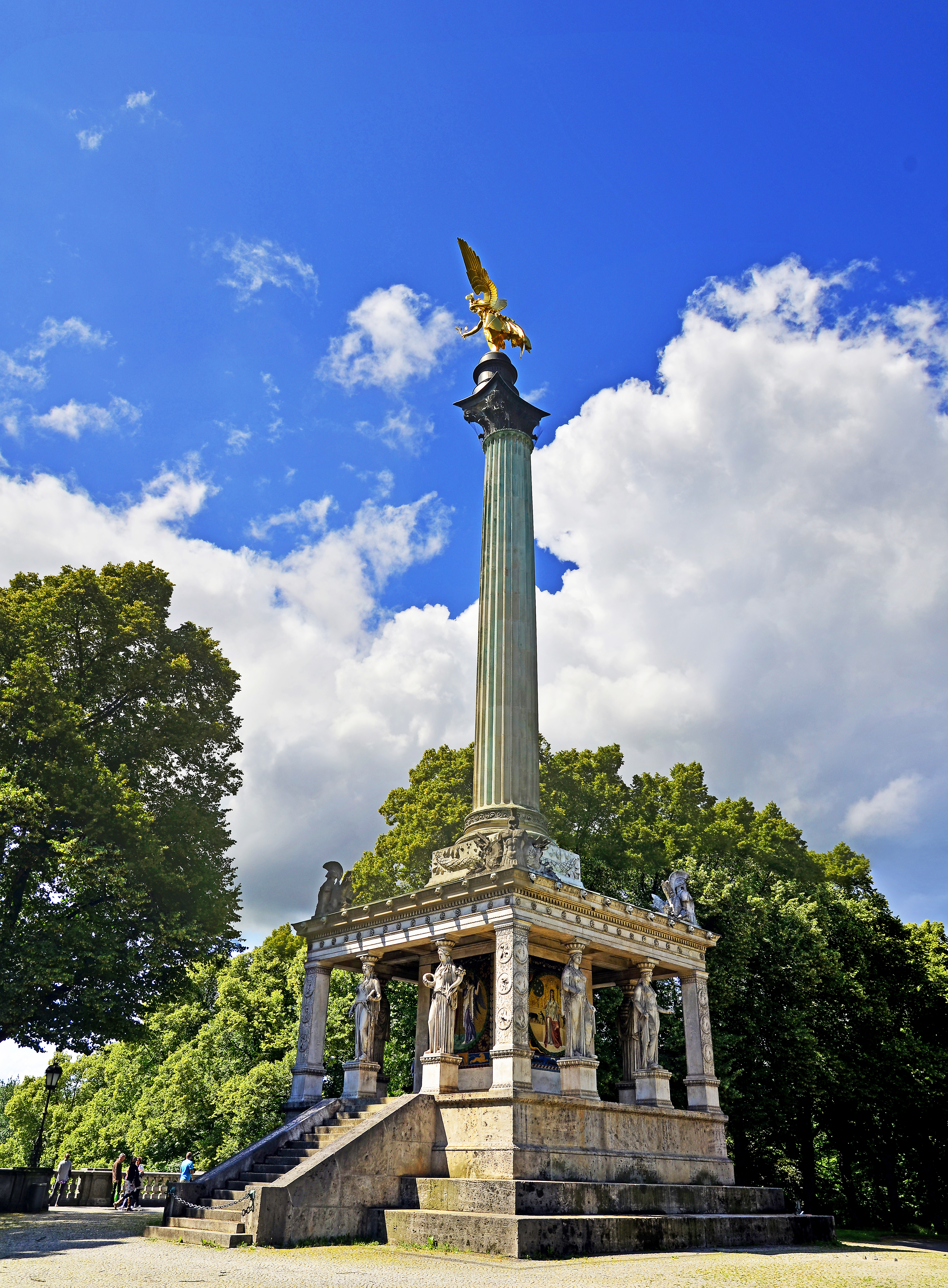
Friedensengel

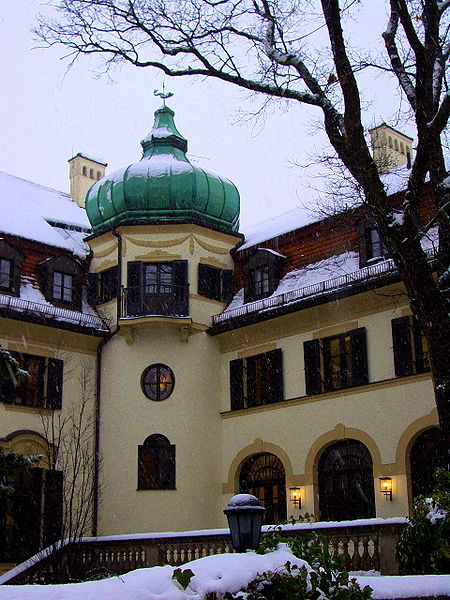
Hildebrandhaus

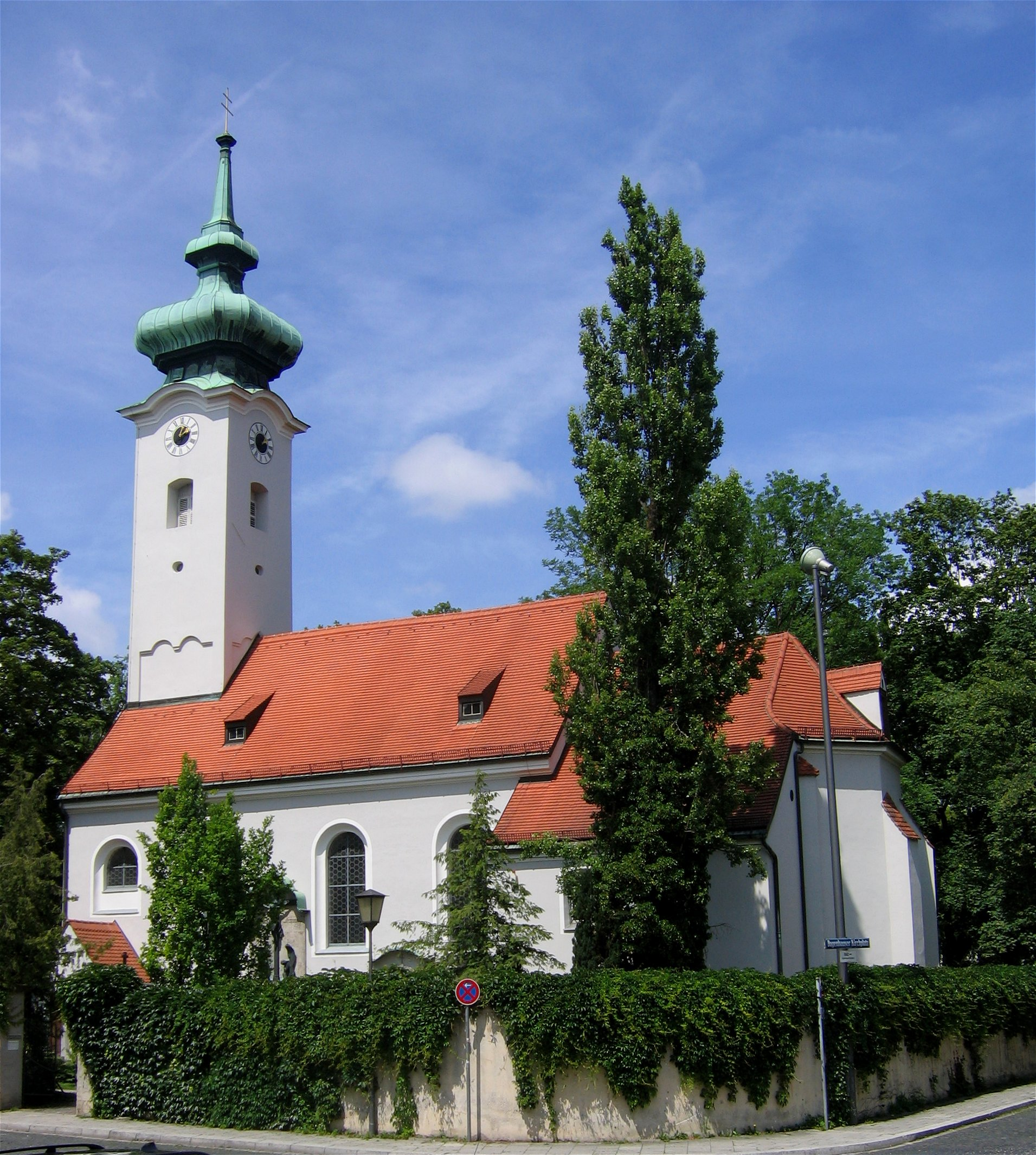
St. Georg

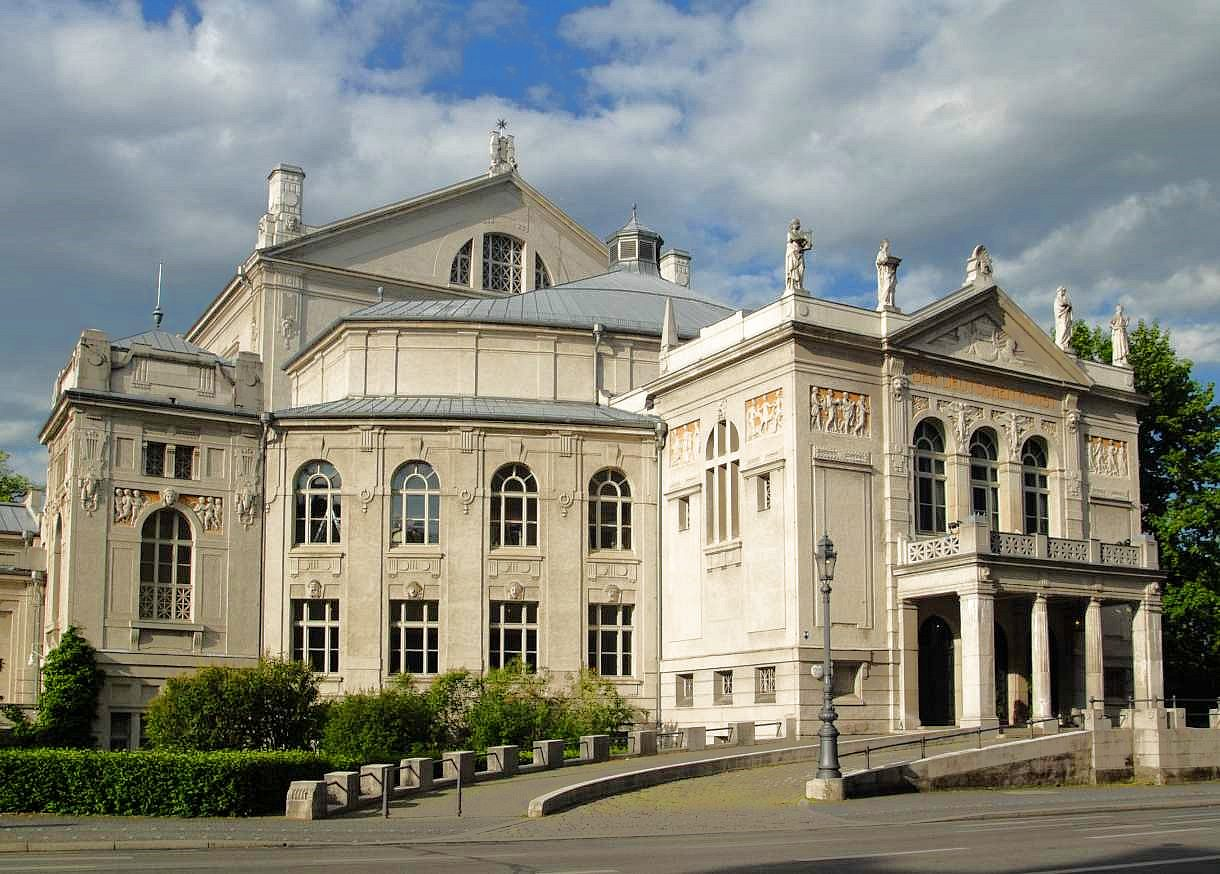
Prinzregententheater

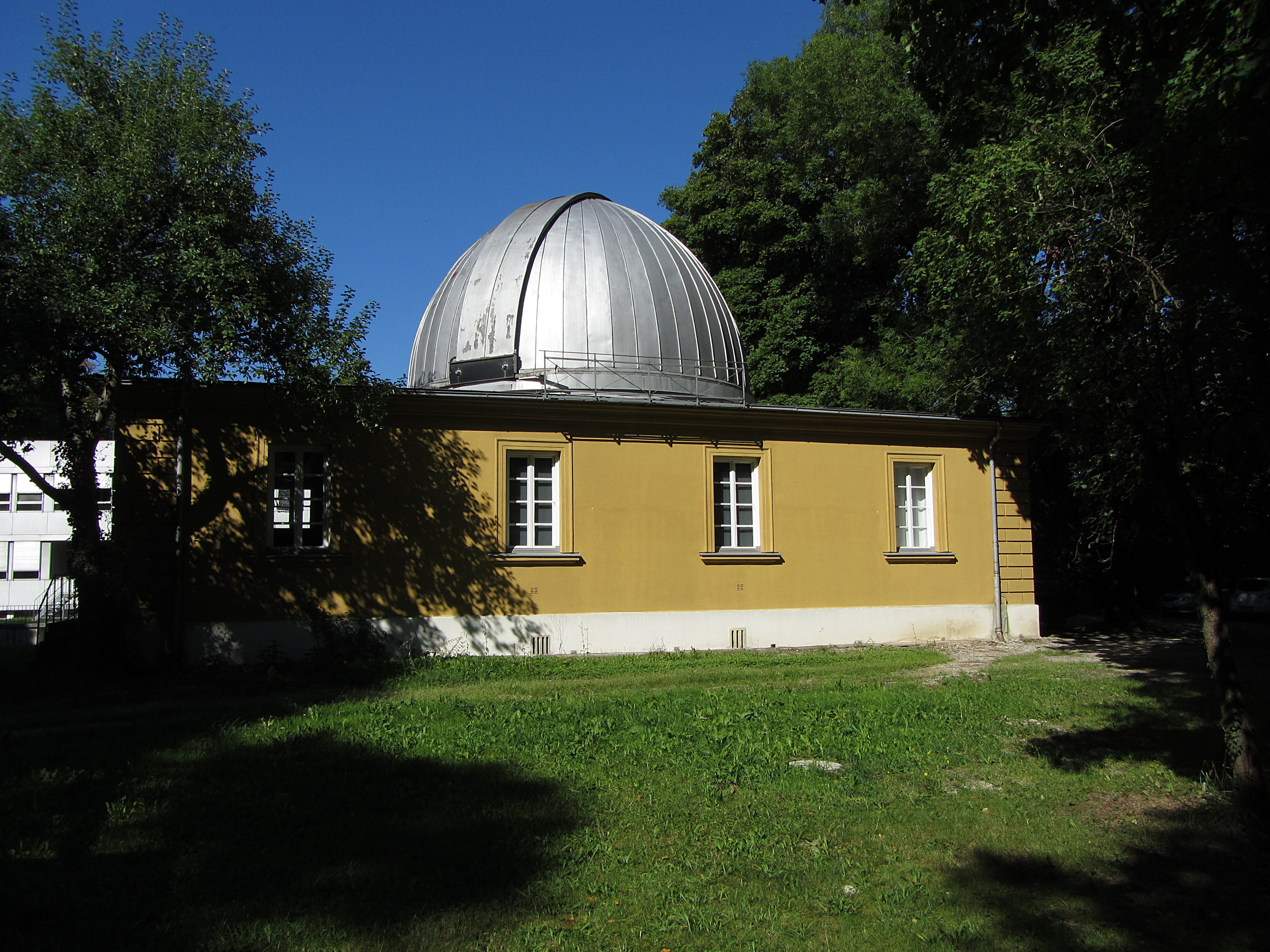
Universitäts-Sternwarte

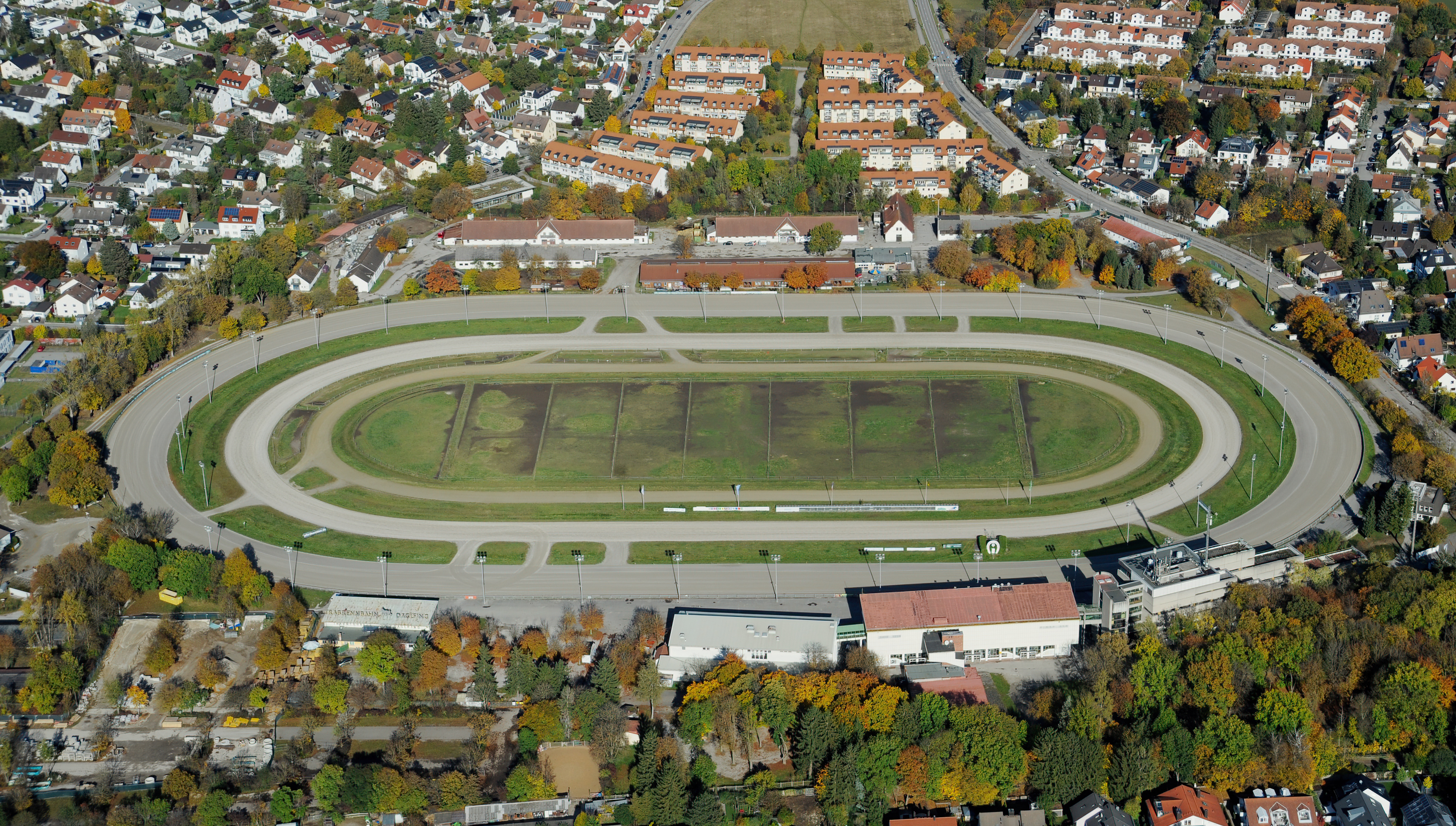
Trabrennbahn Daglfing

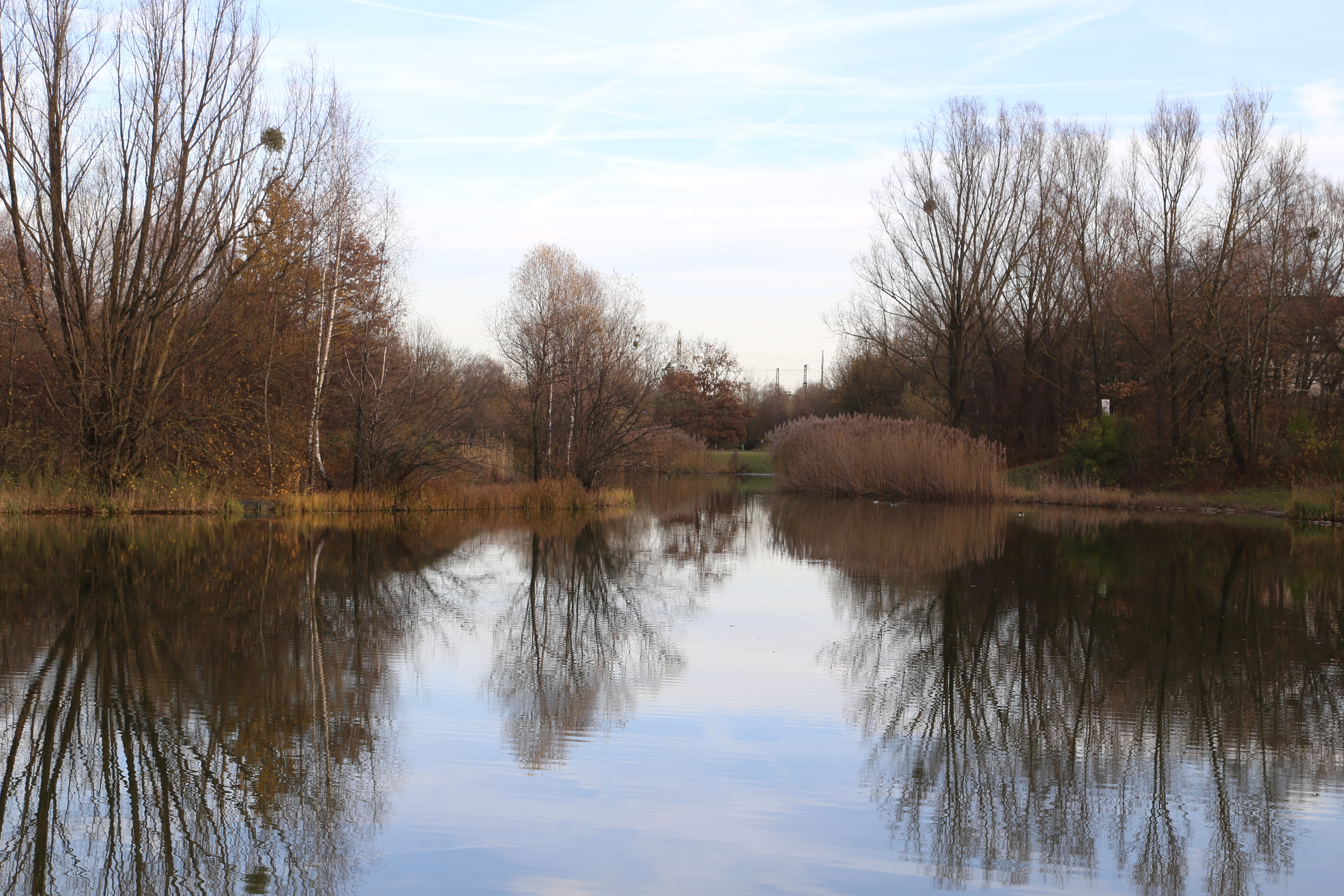
Zamilapark

=== 14 – Berg am Laim ===
From Baumkirchner Straße via St. Michael to the Maikäfersiedlung: Munich East railway depot, St. Stephan's, Grüner Markt, Behrpark, Berg am Laim primary school, Weißes Bräuhaus restaurant, Gerblhof, Electoral Hunting Lodge, Monastery and Institute of the English Miss, St. Mina (formerly Loreto Church), Else-Rosenfeld-Straße, Offenbarungskirche (Church of the Revelation), Judenlager Berg am Laim 1941 - 1943, St. Michael, Sisters of Mercy of St. Vincent von Paul, Maikäfersiedlung.

Industrial quarter east and south of the railway: Pfanni-Werk, Dynamit AG - Fabrik München, Zündapp-Werk, Gewofag-Siedlung Neuramersdorf, Social Democratic Resistance in Neuramersdorf, St. Pius, Coal and Briquette Shop Siegfried Gerson, Karl Zimmet, Franz Kathreiner's Nachfolger AG, Grundler-Villa, Betriebe Streitfeldstraße, Children's Home of the Blue Sisters of St. Elisabeth, Cognac Distillery Macholl

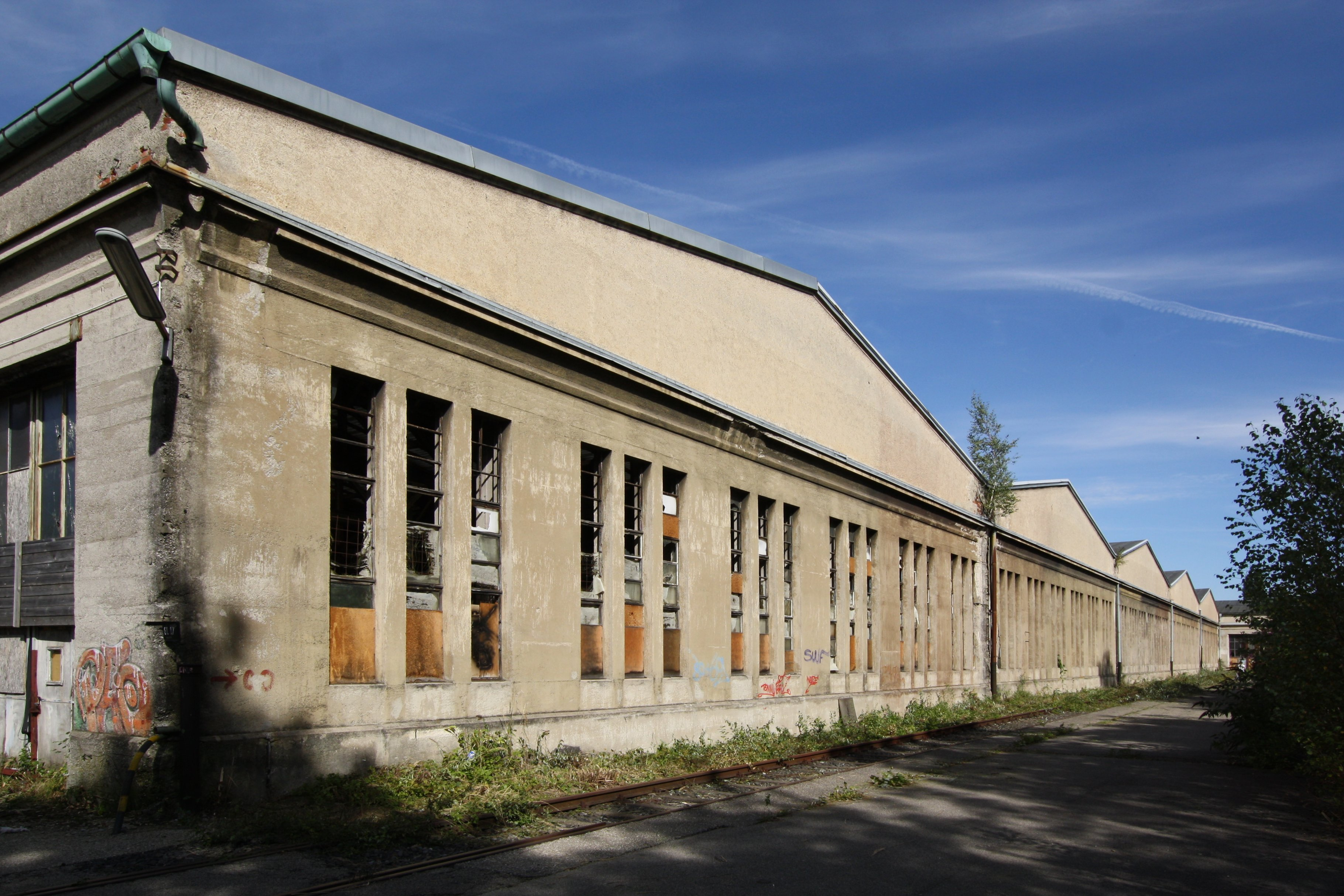
Munich East railway depot

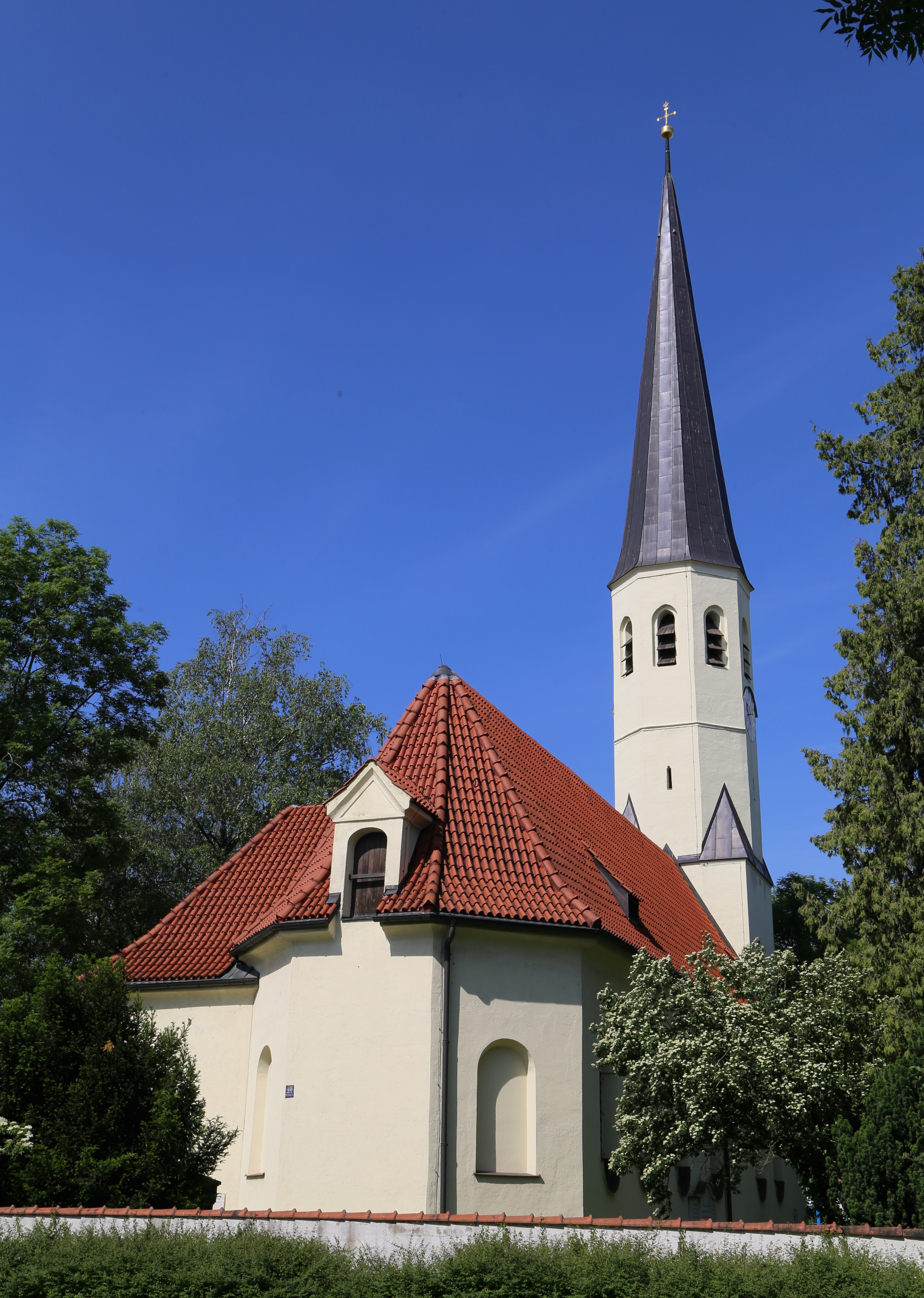
St. Stephan

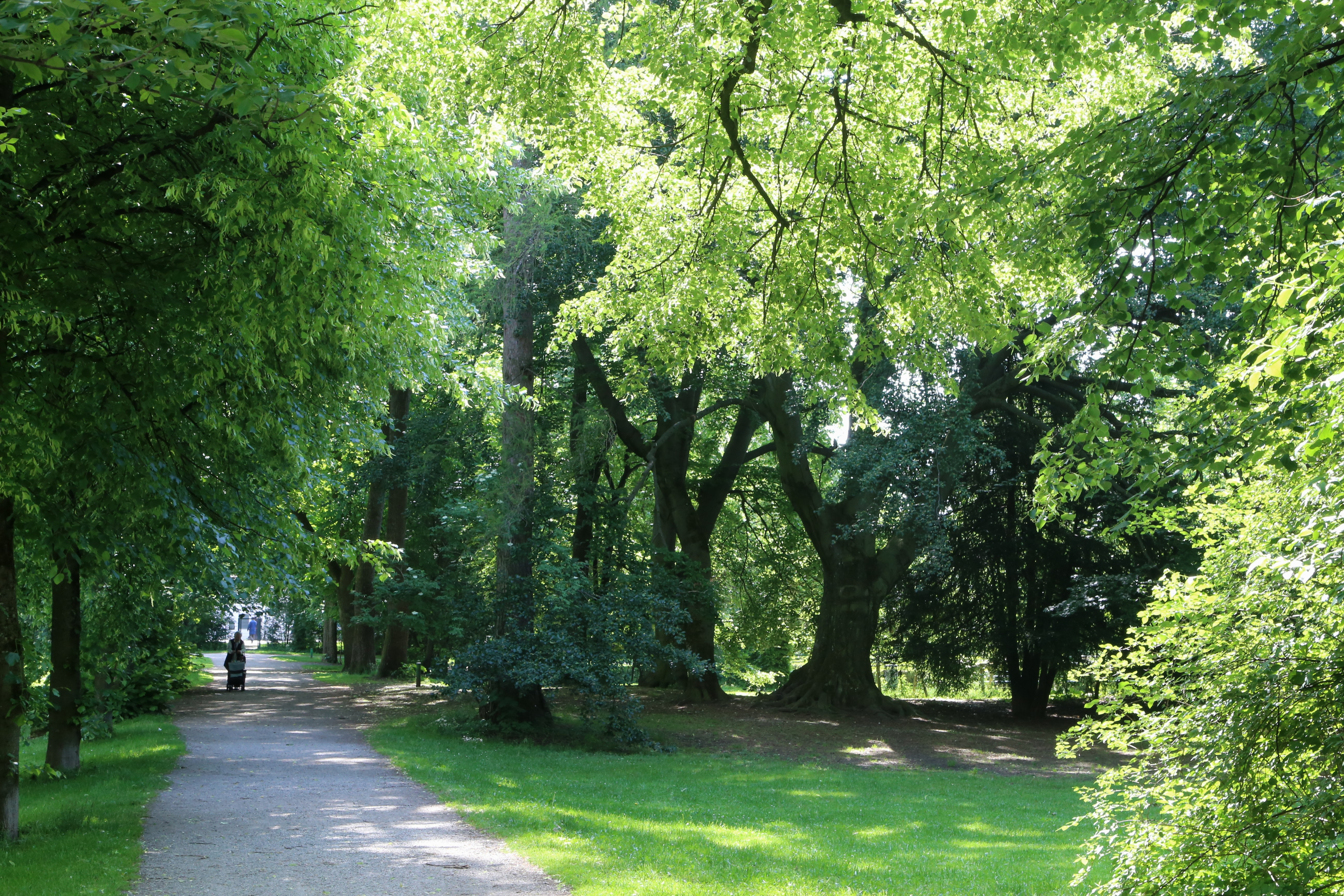
Behrpark

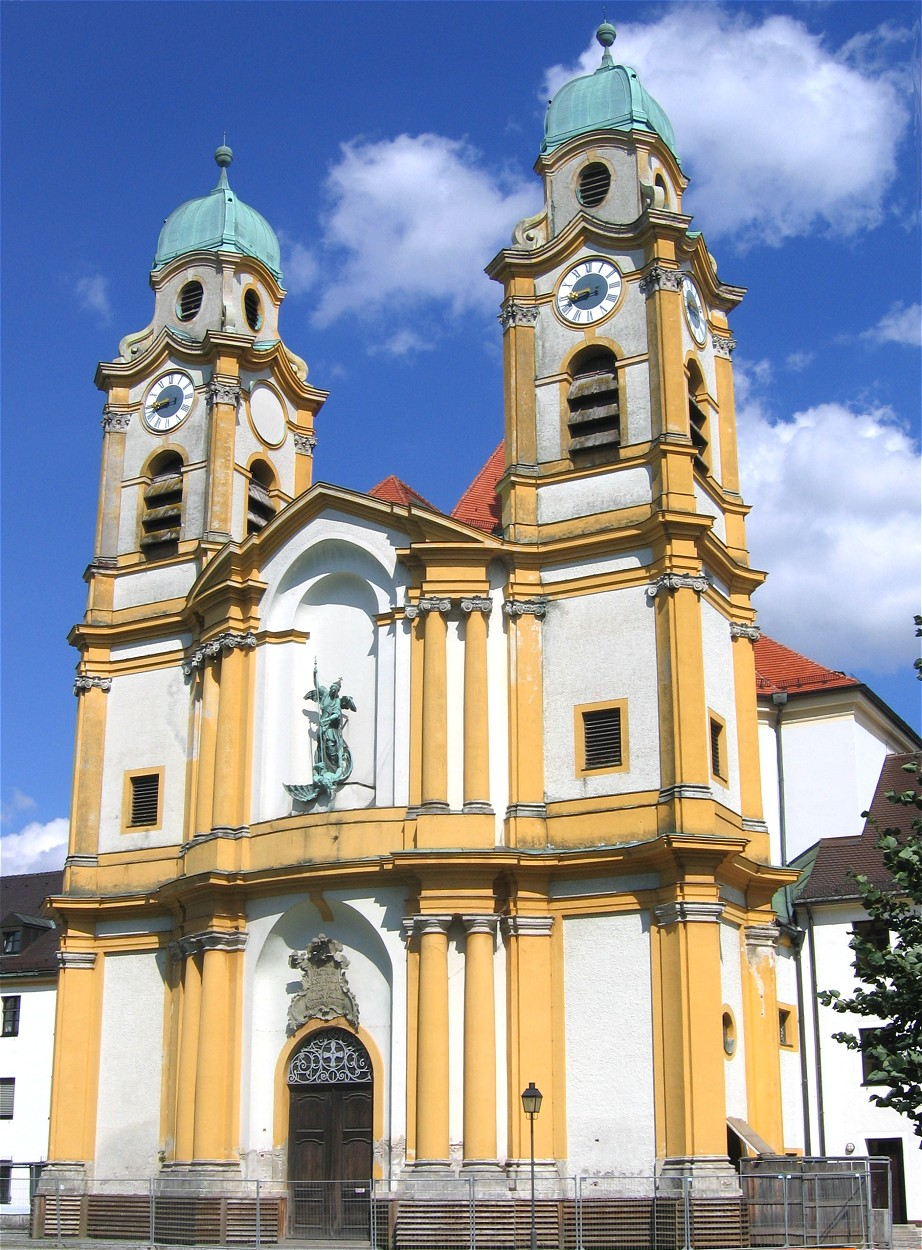
St. Michael

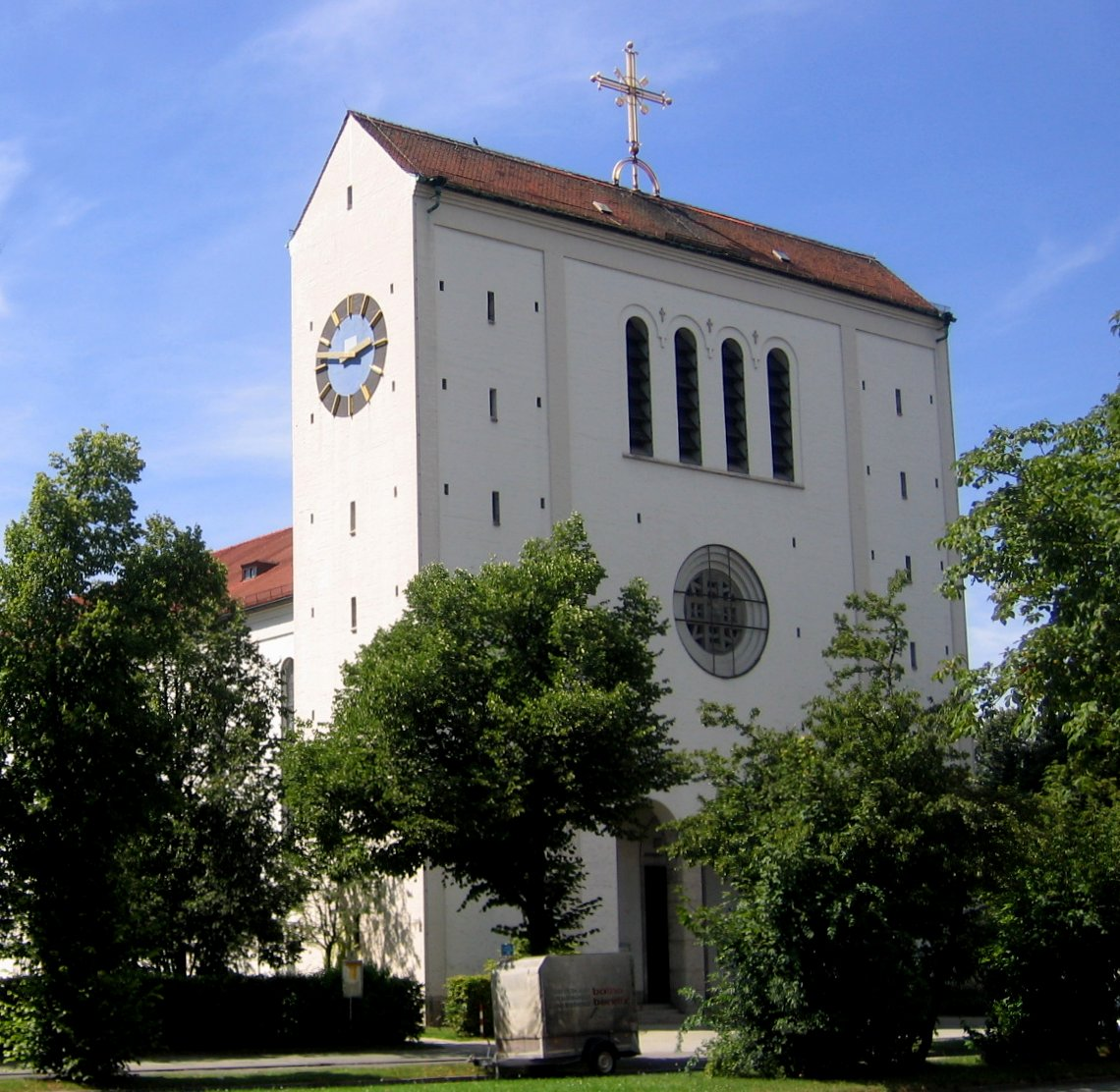
St. Pius

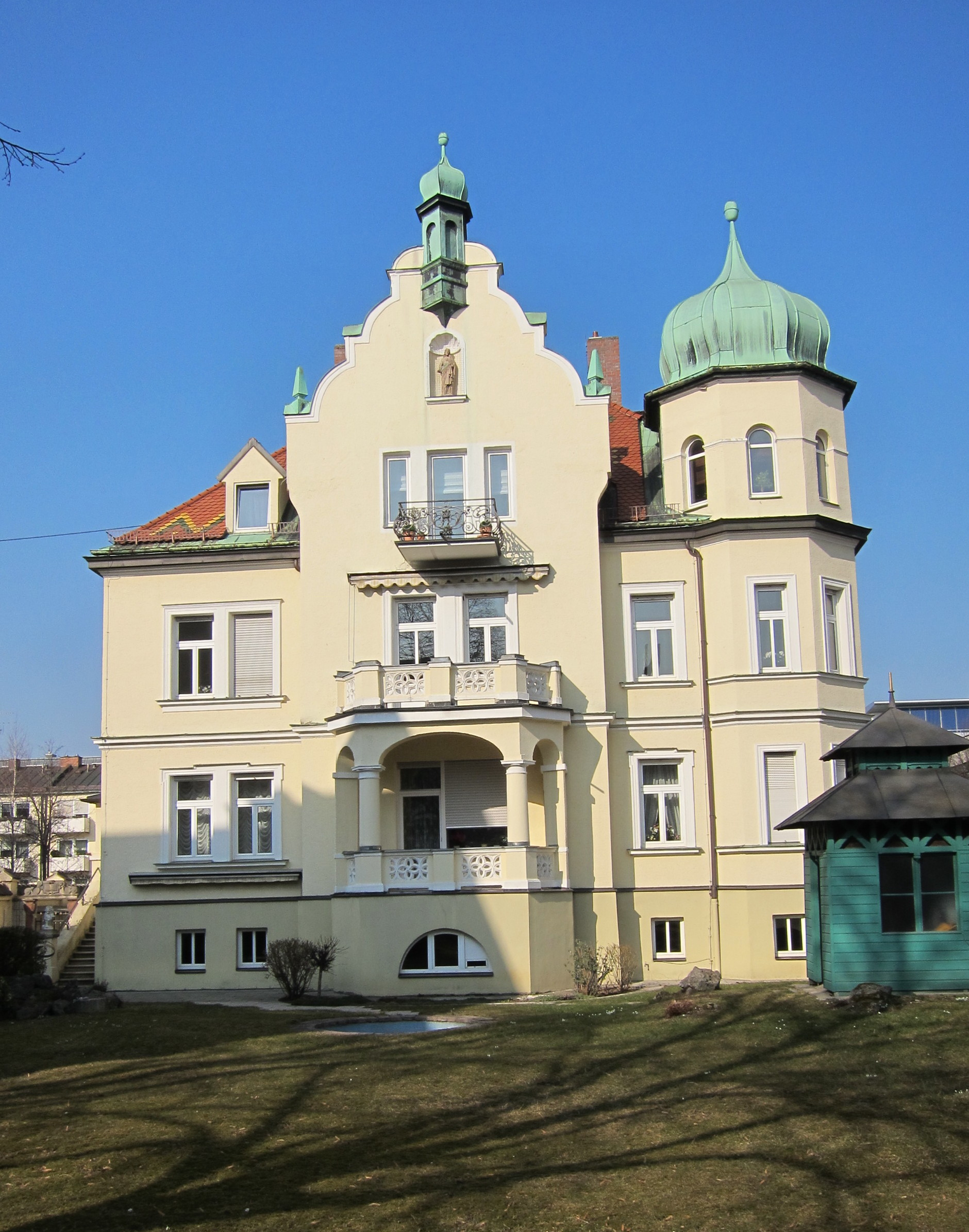
Grundler Villa

=== 15 - Trudering-Riem ===
Cycle tour through Riem - from the race course to Riemer Park: Riem race course, Olympic riding facility, TSV Maccabi Munich, St. Martin, Friedhof Riem, Munich-Riem Airport, Messestadt, Riemer Park.

From Kirchtrudering to Straßtrudering - from Manchesterplatz to Gasthof Obermaier: Manchesterplatz, Gasthof Göttler, war monument, St. Peter and Paul, Truderinger train station, Weinkelterei Neuner, former municipal administration, Gasthof Obermaier.

Cycle tour through Waldtrudering - from the water tower to the gymnastics school: water tower and fire brigade, Gasthof Phantasie, Lachenmeyrstraße, "colonial quarter", Christi Himmelfahrt (Parish church), gymnastics school.

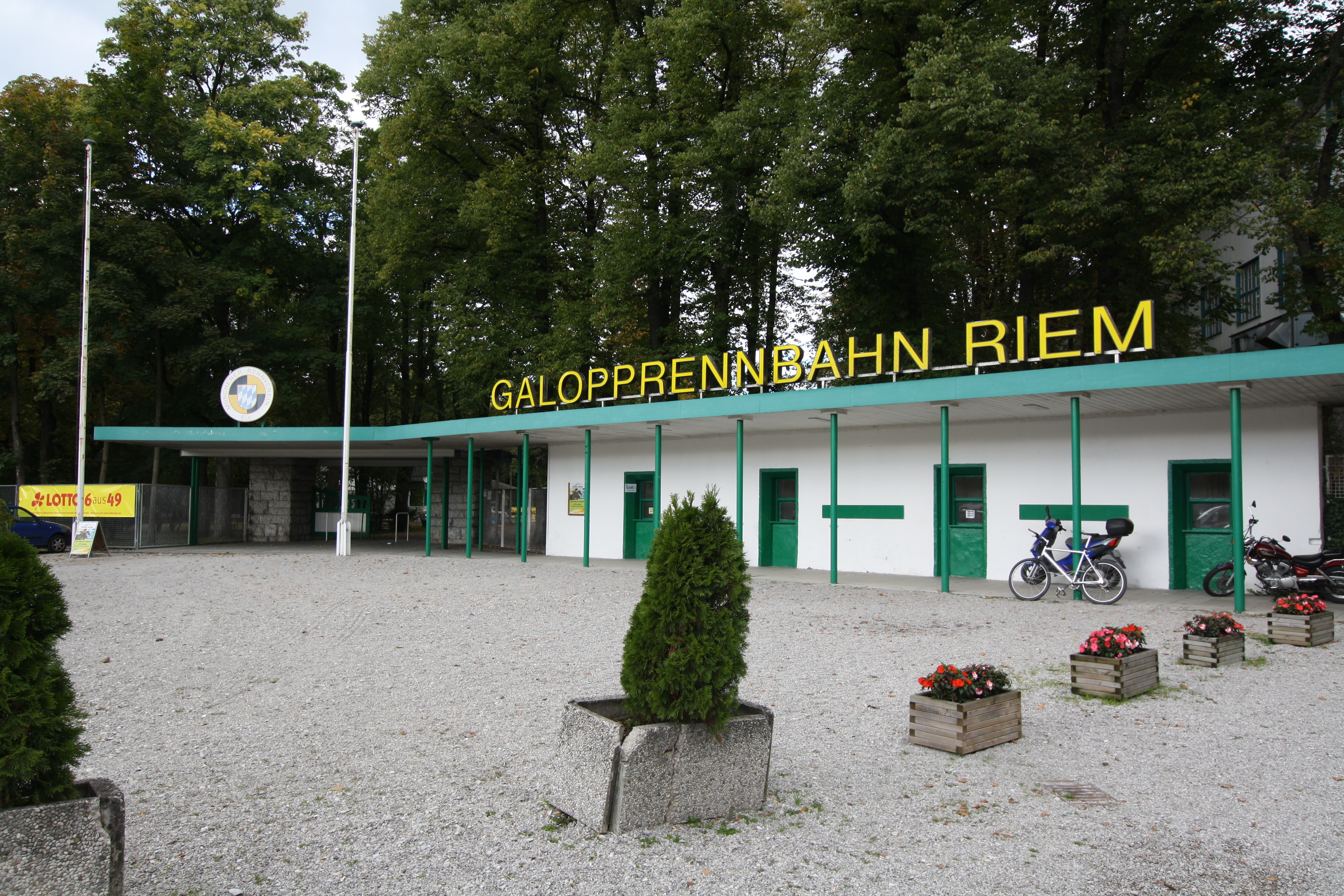
Galopprennbahn Riem

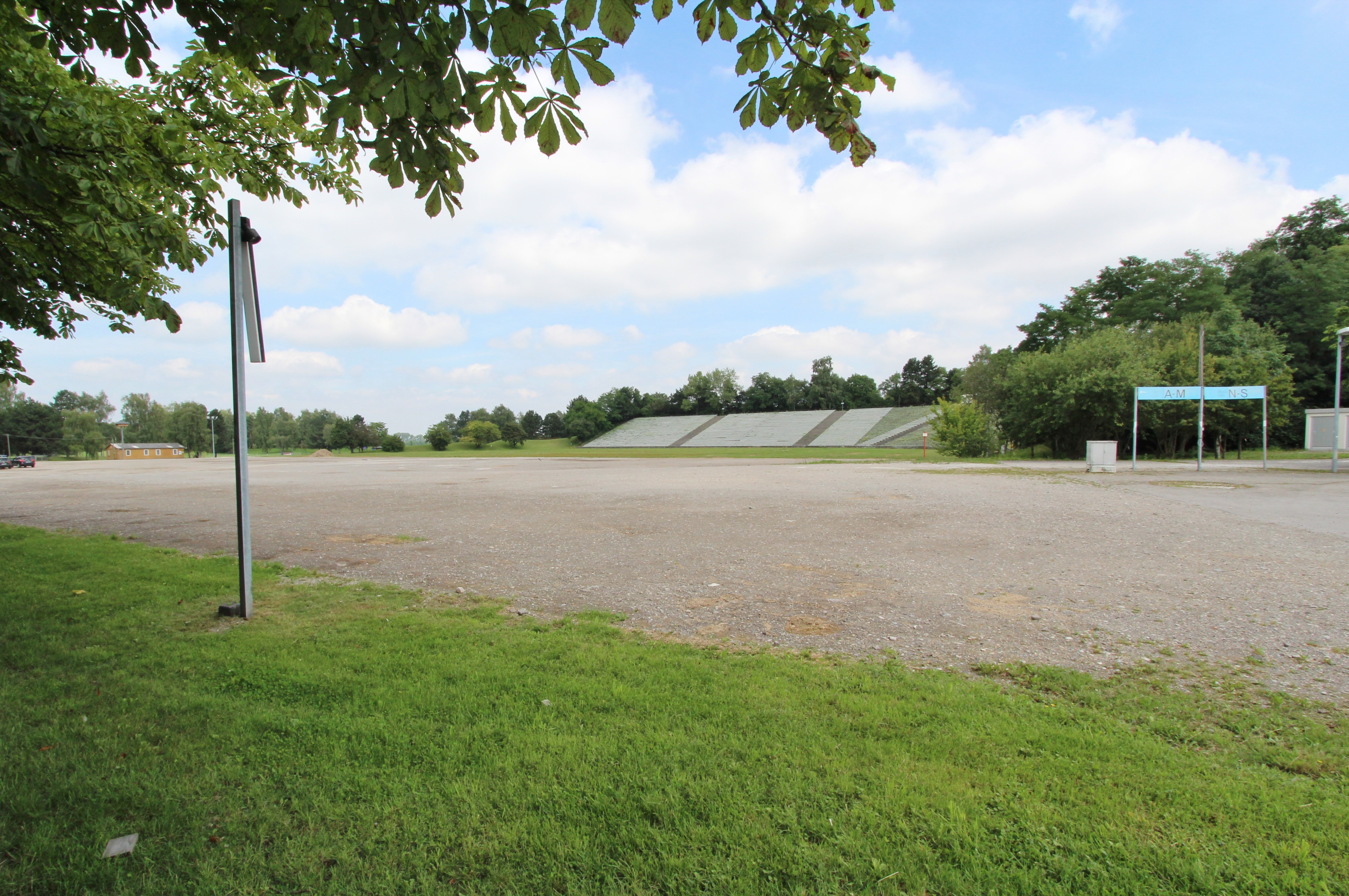
Reitstadion Riem

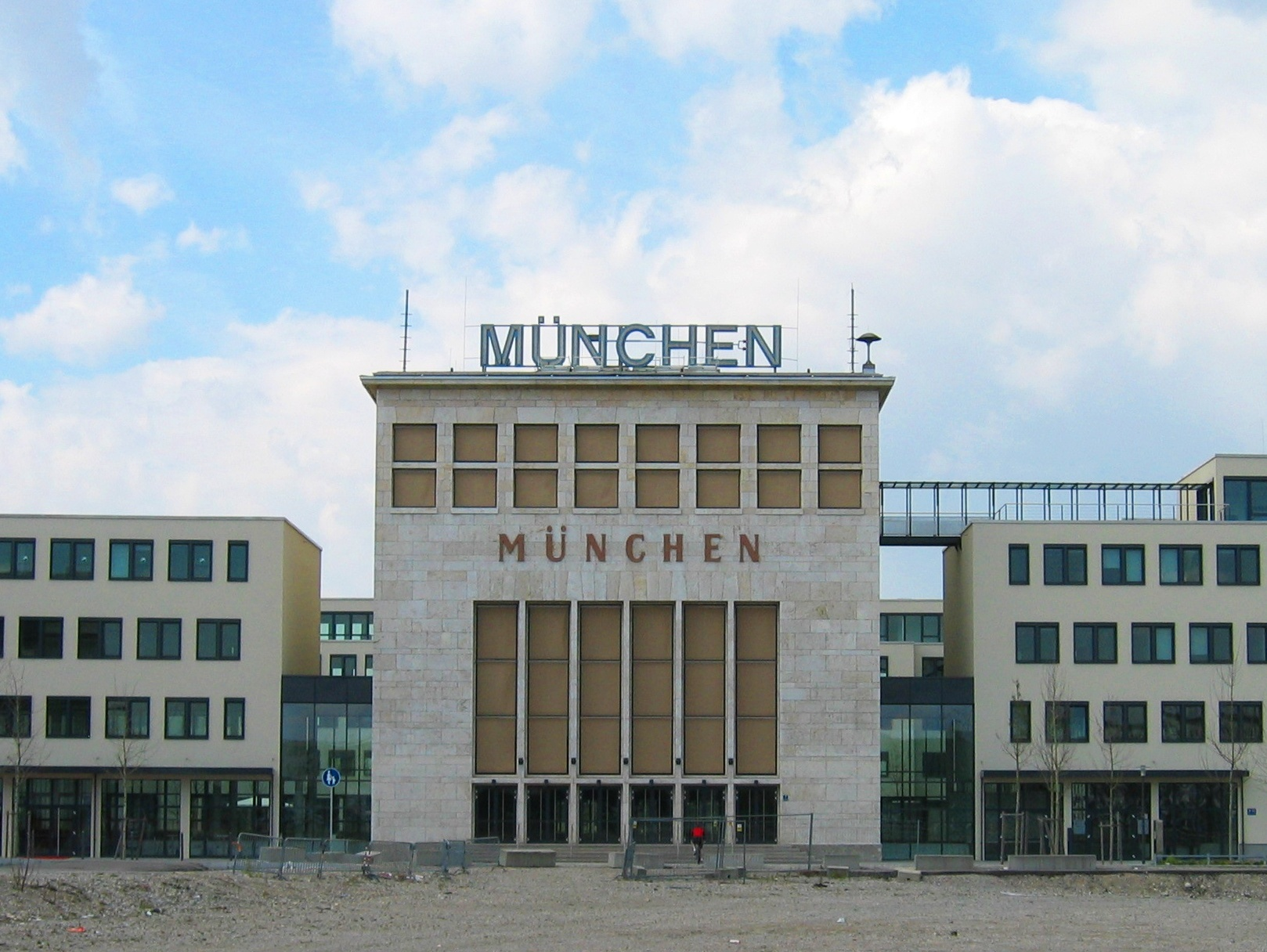
Flughafen München-Riem

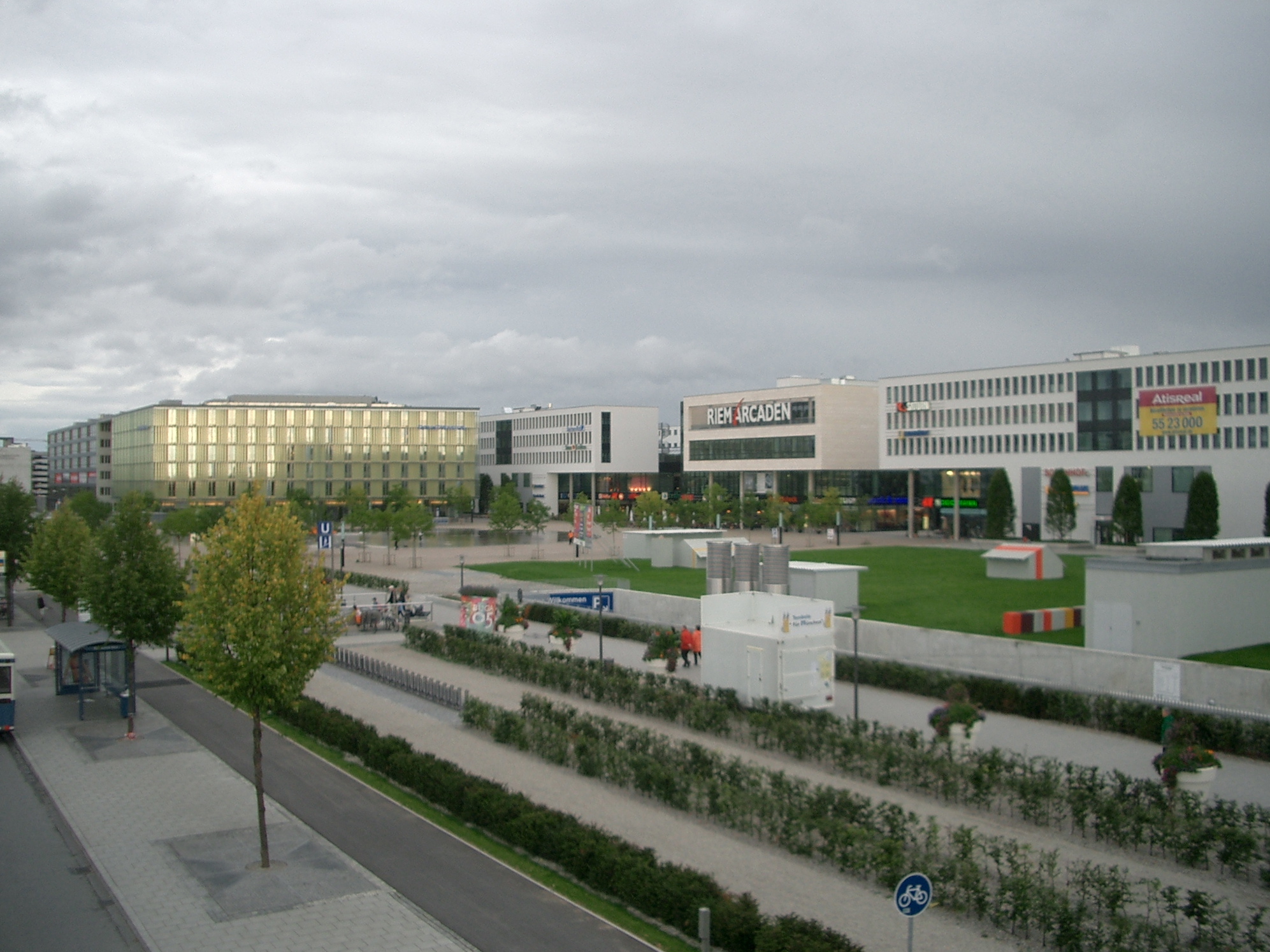
Willy-Brandt-Platz

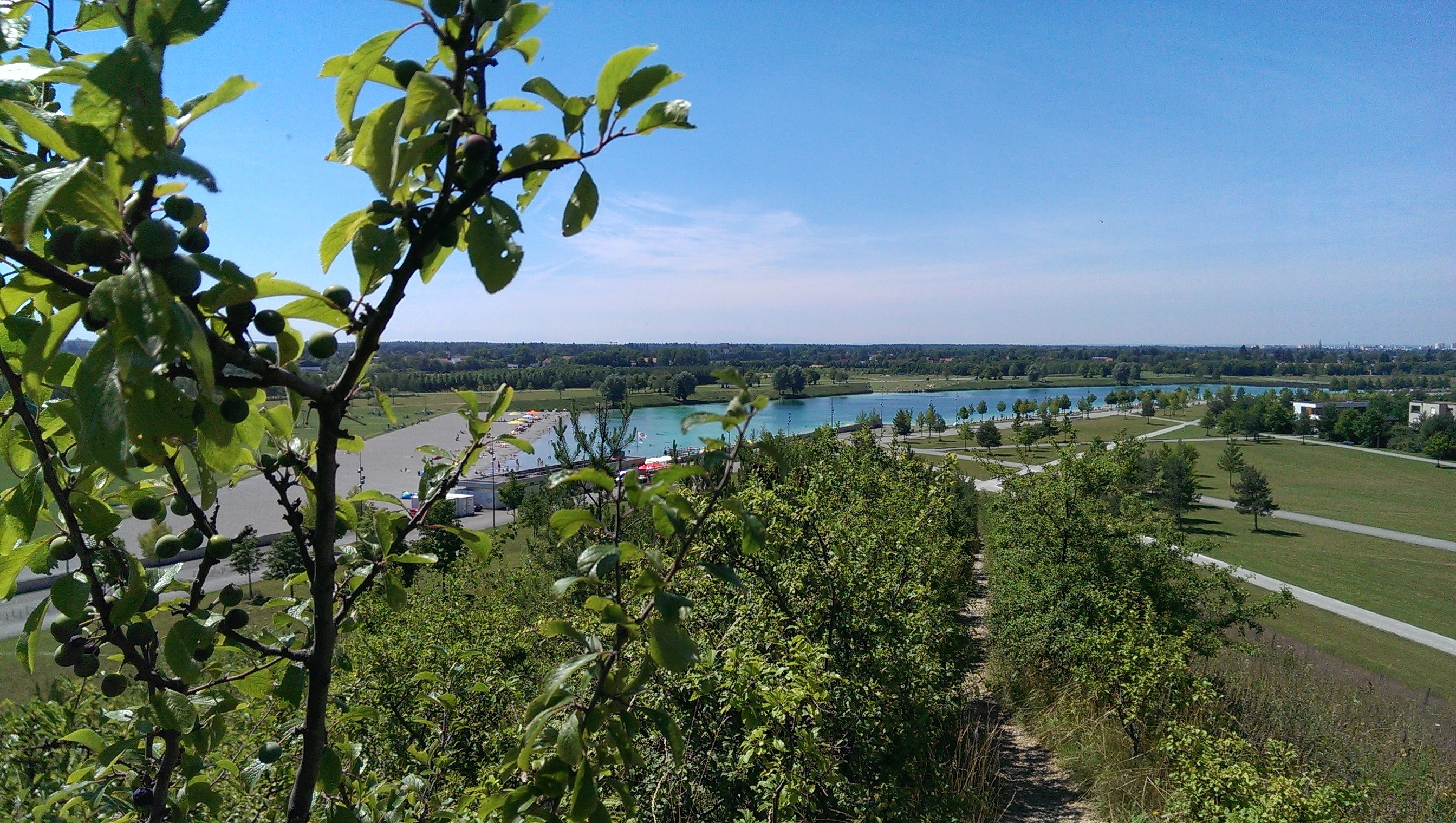
Riemer Park

=== 16 – Ramersdorf-Perlach ===
Ramersdorf: pilgrimage church Maria Ramersdorf, historical core Ramersdorf, GEWOFAG-Siedlung, Amerikaner-Siedlung, Mustersiedlung Ramersdorf (model settlement).

Perlach/Neuperlach: Ottobrunner Straße, Schmidbauerstraße, Klinikum München Perlach, Pfanzeltplatz, Sebastian-Bauer-Straße, St.-Paulus-Kirche, St. Michael Kirche, Theodor-Heuss-Platz, Neuperlach Centre.

Neuperlach-Süd/Waldperlach/Neuperlach-Nord/Ostpark: Neuperlach-Süd, Waldheimplatz, Jubilate-Kirche, Salzmannstraße, Perlacher Wald, Klinikum Neuperlach, residential area north, Ostpark

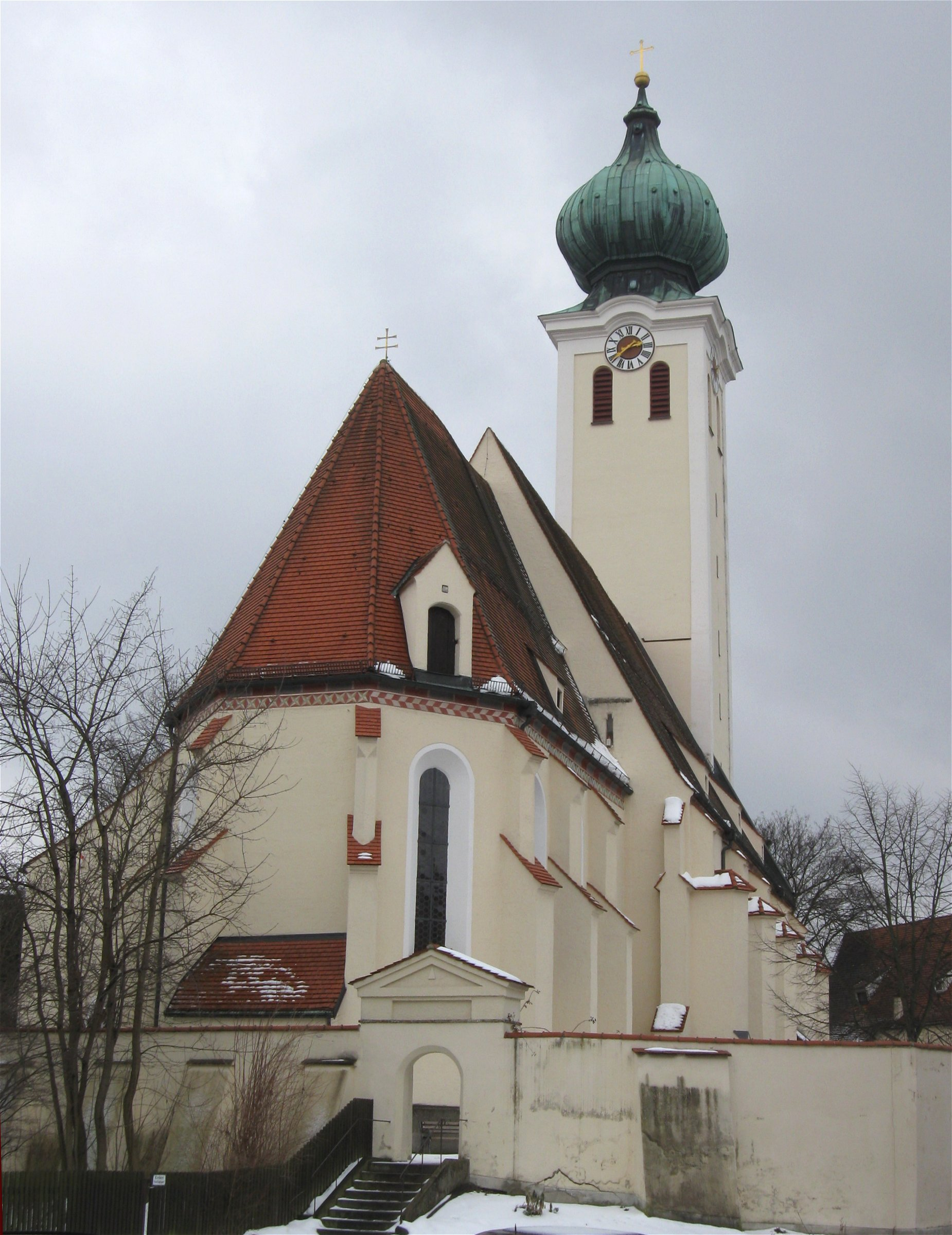
Maria Ramersdorf

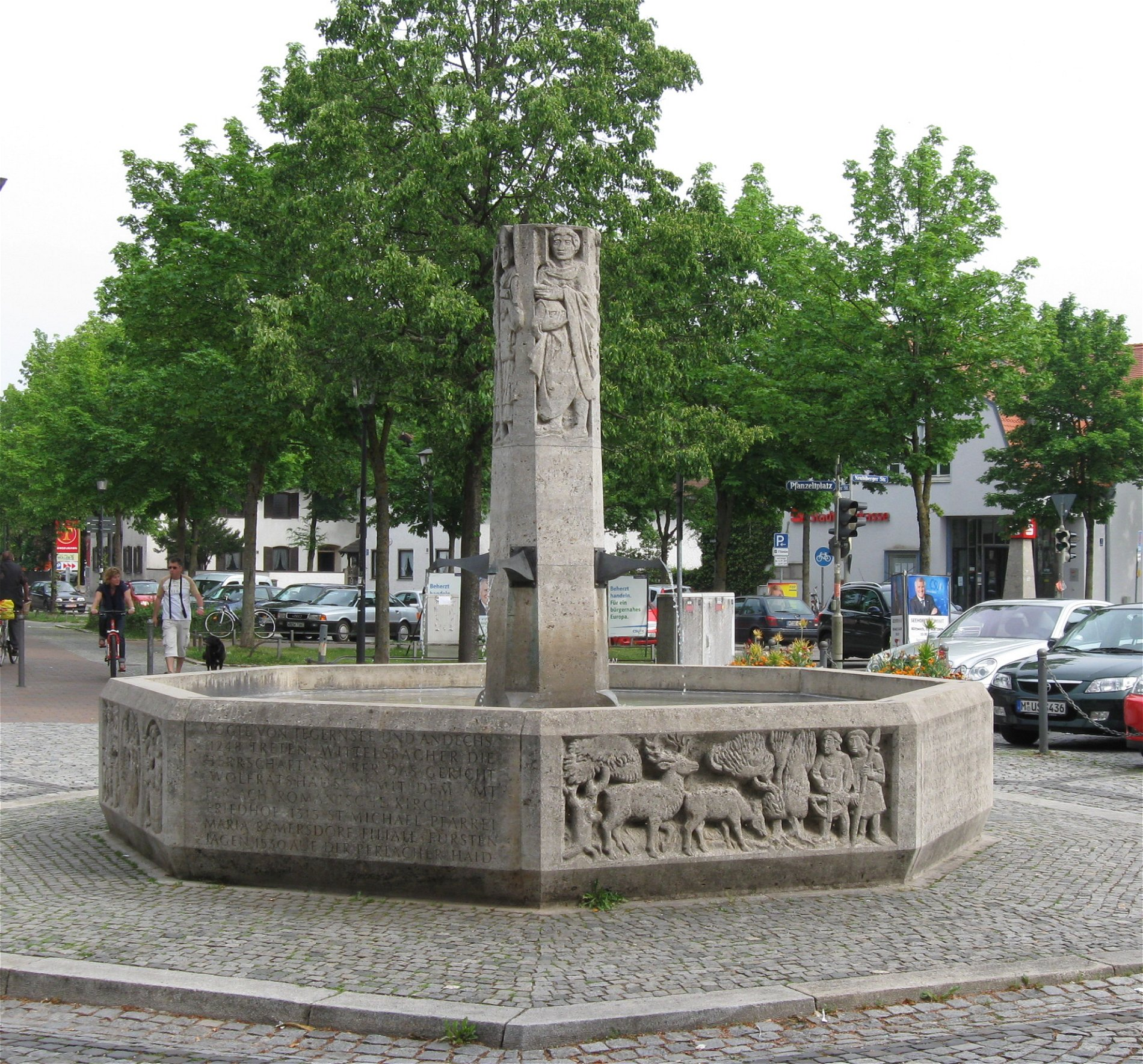
Pfanzeltplatz

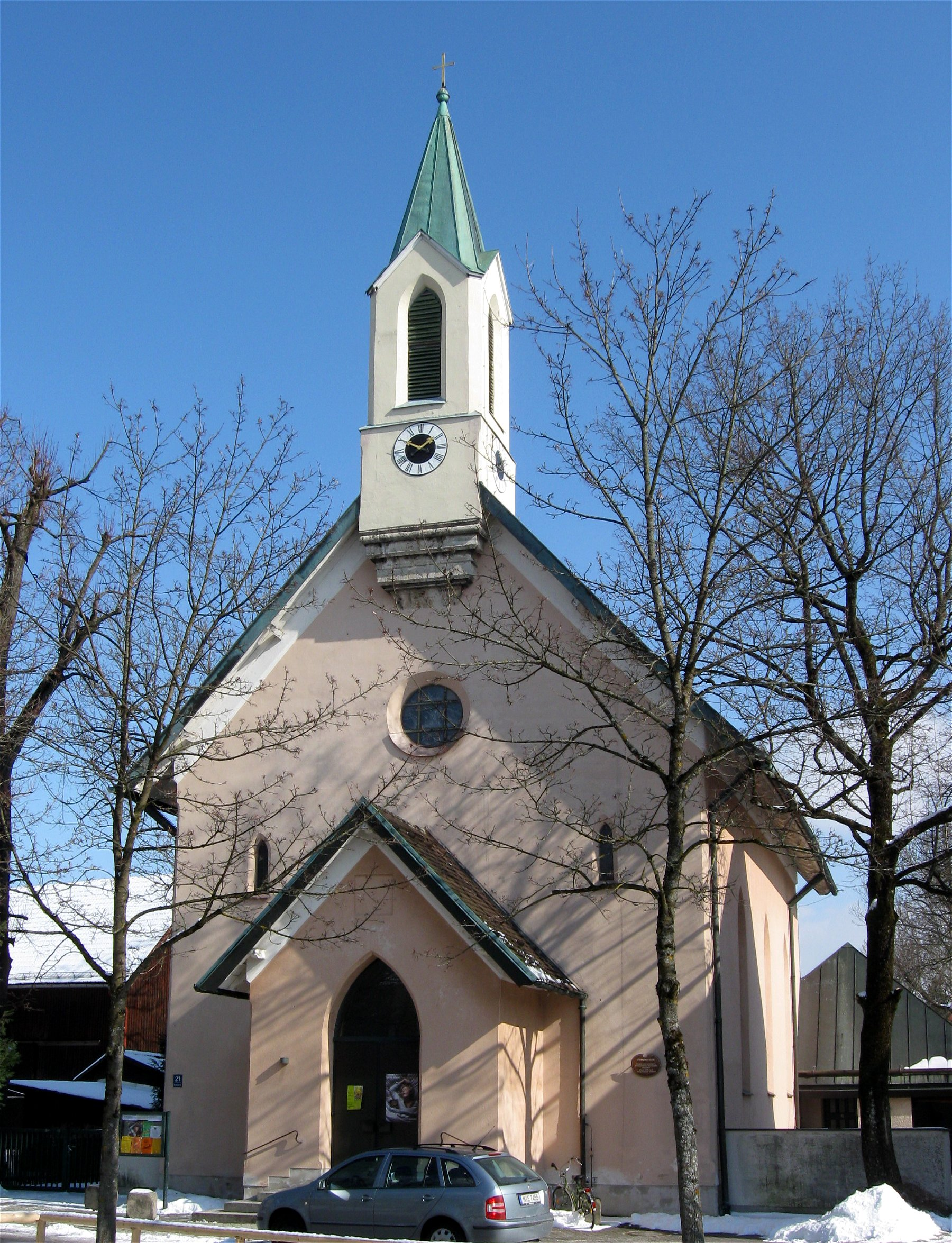
St.-Paulus-Kirche

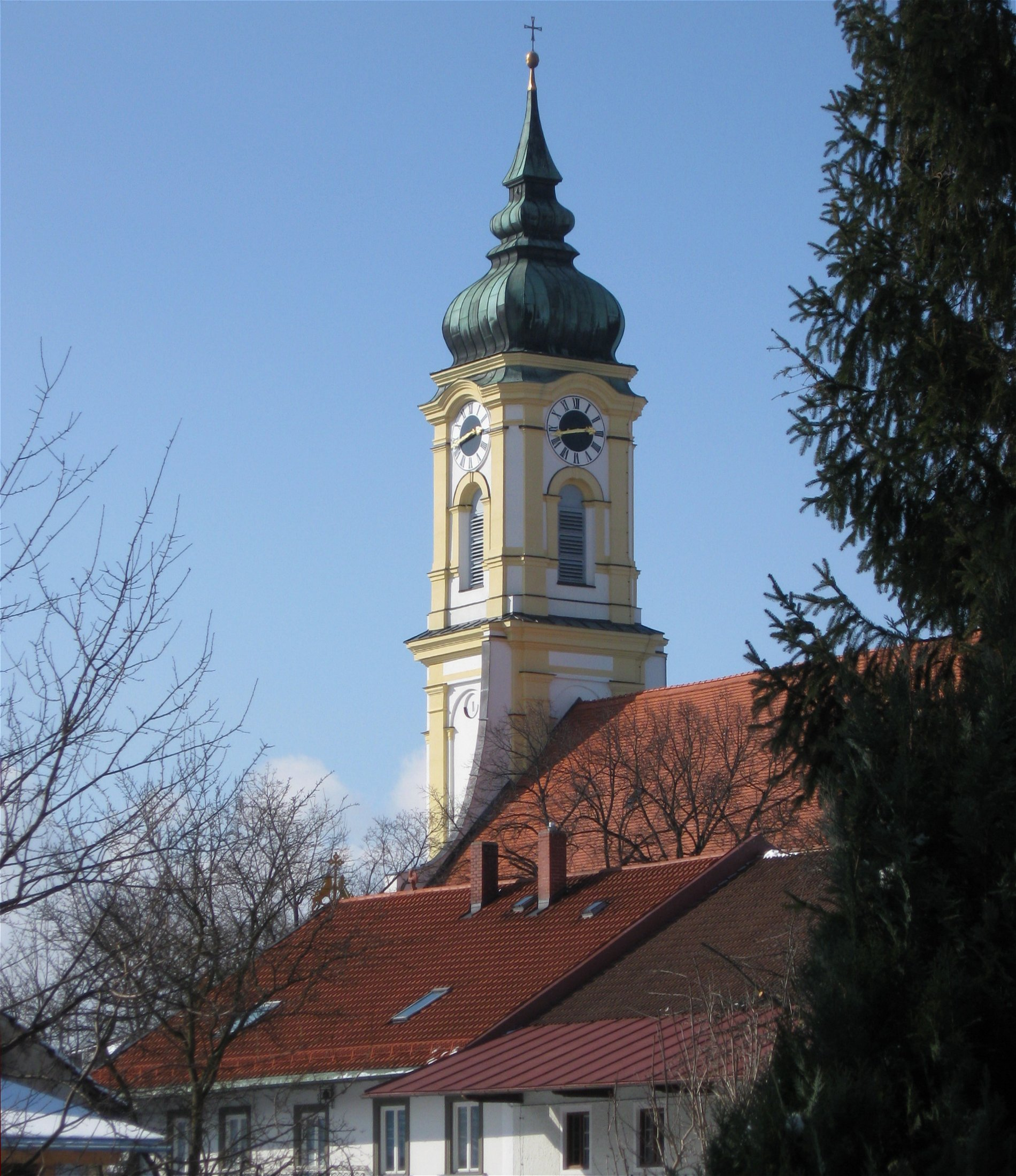
St. Michael

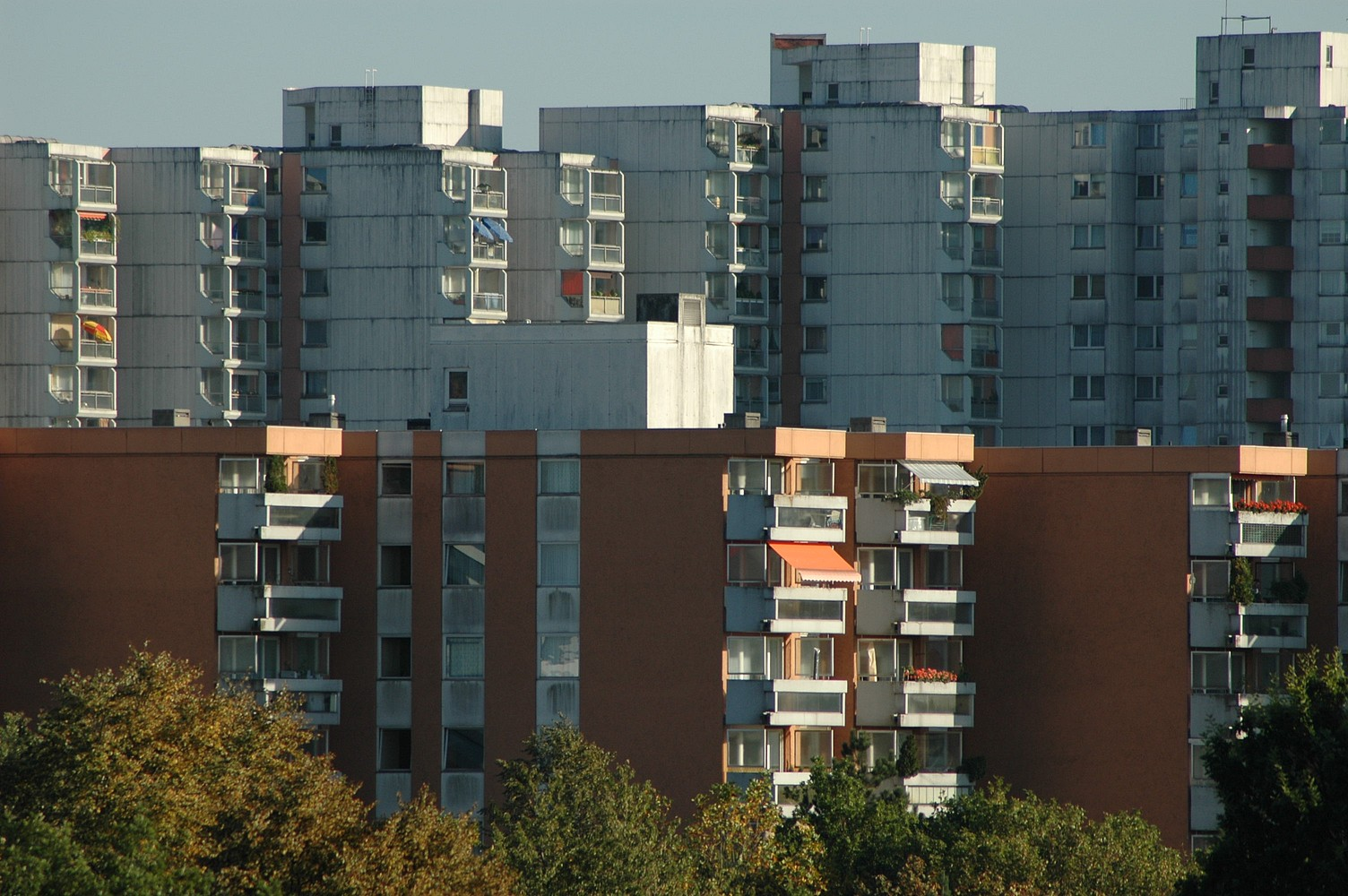
Neuperlach

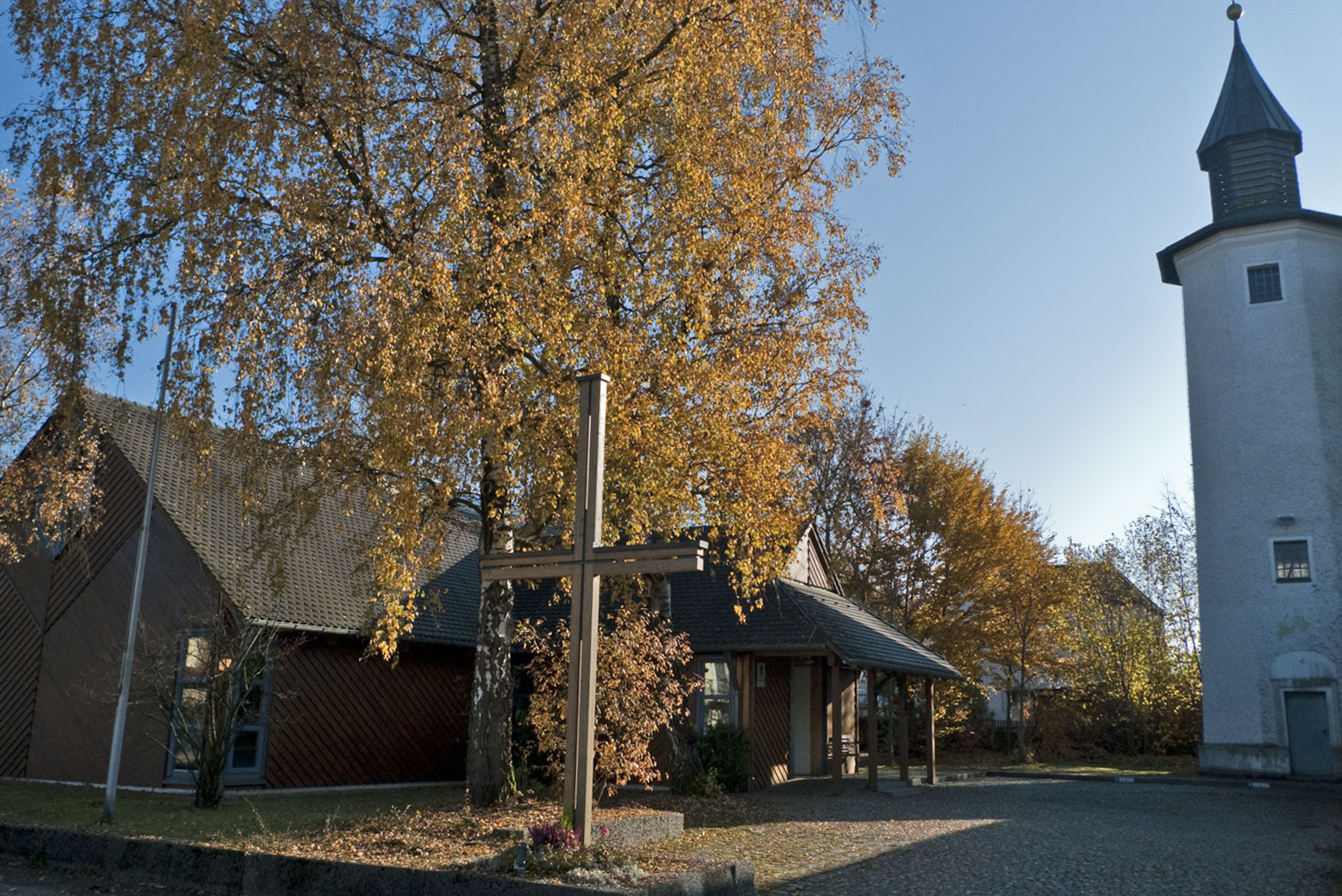
Jubilate-Kirche

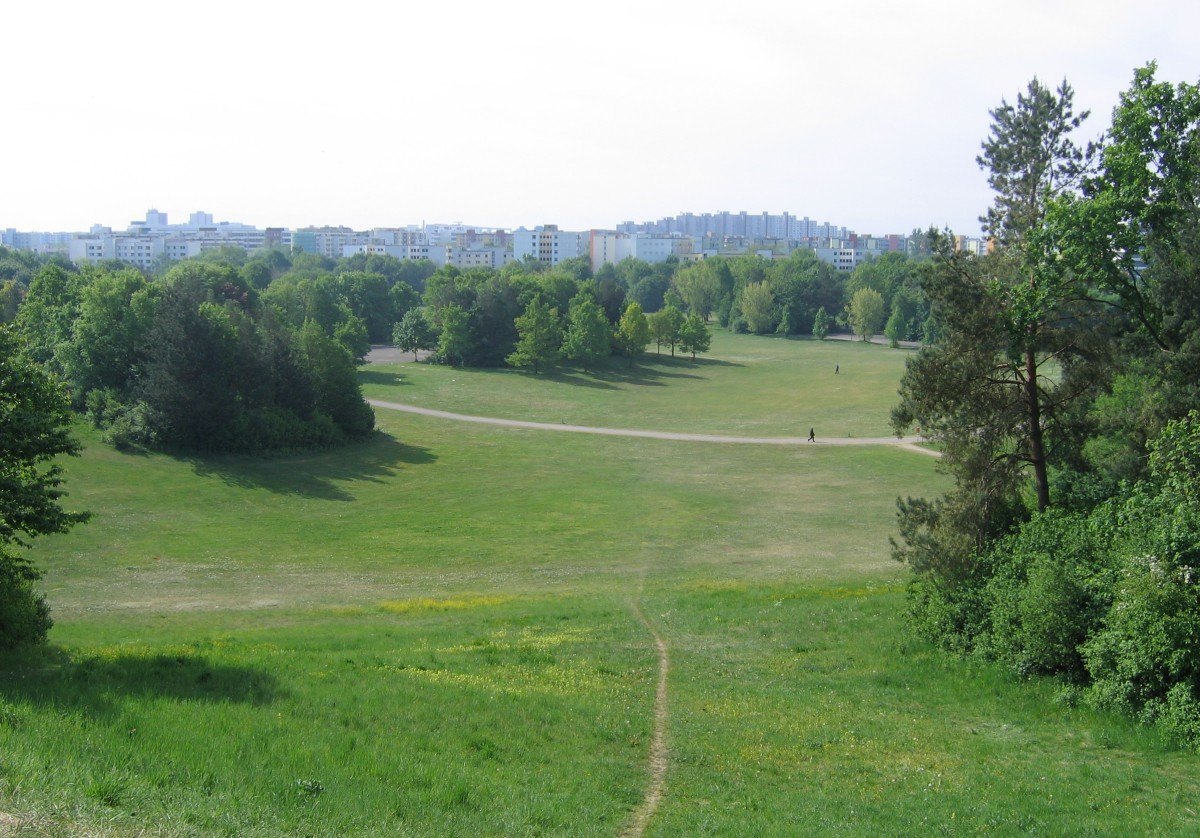
Ostpark

=== 17 – Obergiesing-Fasangarten ===
Through the old Obergiesing: Giesinger Berg, Martin-Luther-Straße, Lutherkirche, Ichoschule, Kloster der Armen Schulschwestern, Tela-Post, Heilig-Kreuz-Kirche, Feldmüllersiedlung, Lotte and Gottlieb Branz, Ostfriedhof, Altenheim St. Martin, Queen of Peace, Giesinger Bahnhof.

From the Walchensee settlement to the Fasangarten: Walchensee Settlement, Agfa concentration camp subcamp, Agfa, Reichszeugmeisterei/McGraw Kaserne, Justizvollzugsanstalt Stadelheim (Prison), Herbert-Quandt-Straße, Friedhof am Perlacher Forst, Perlach Forest Small Estate, Perlach Forest Small Estate, Perlach Forest American Settlement, Fasangarten.

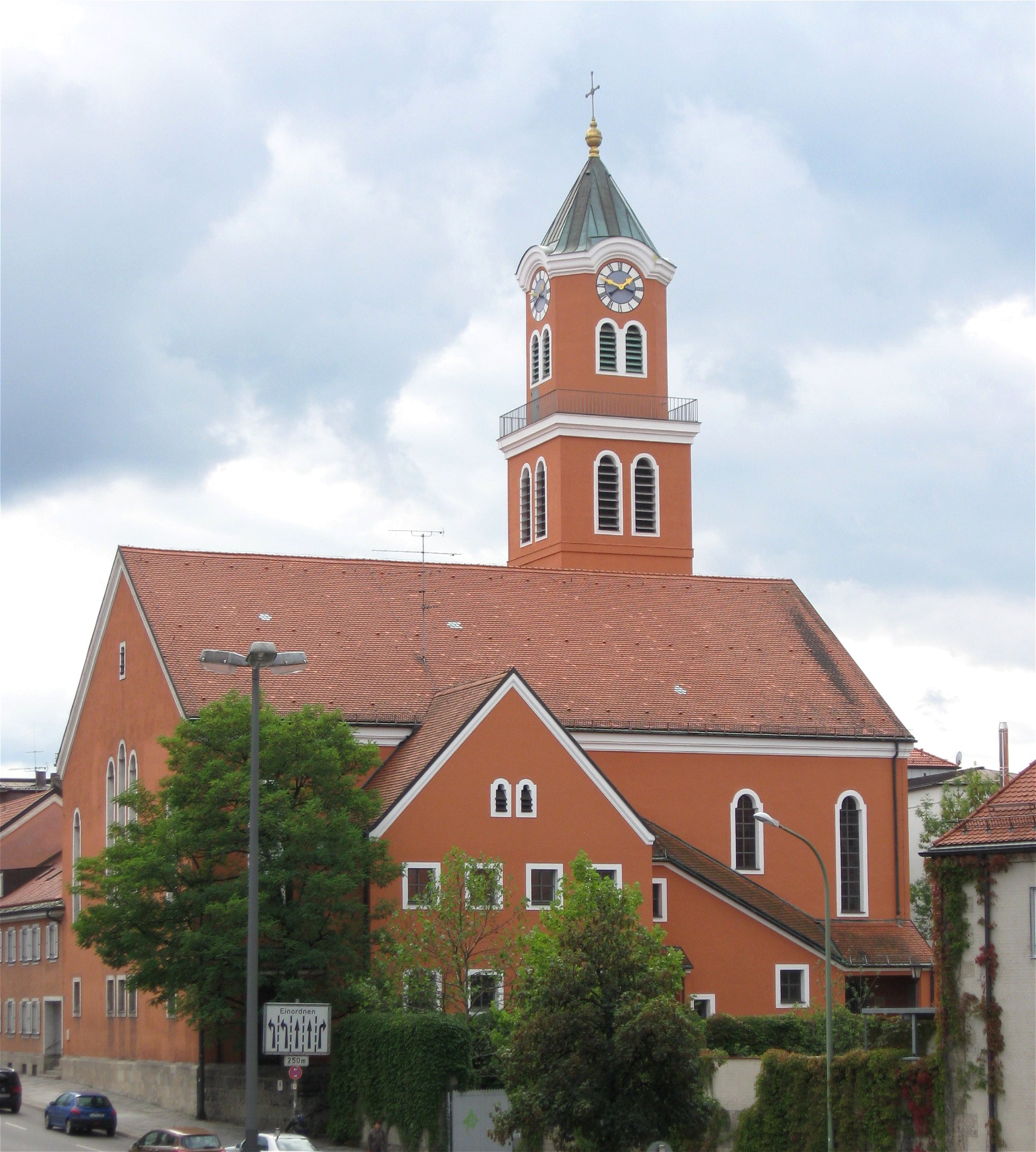
Lutherkirche

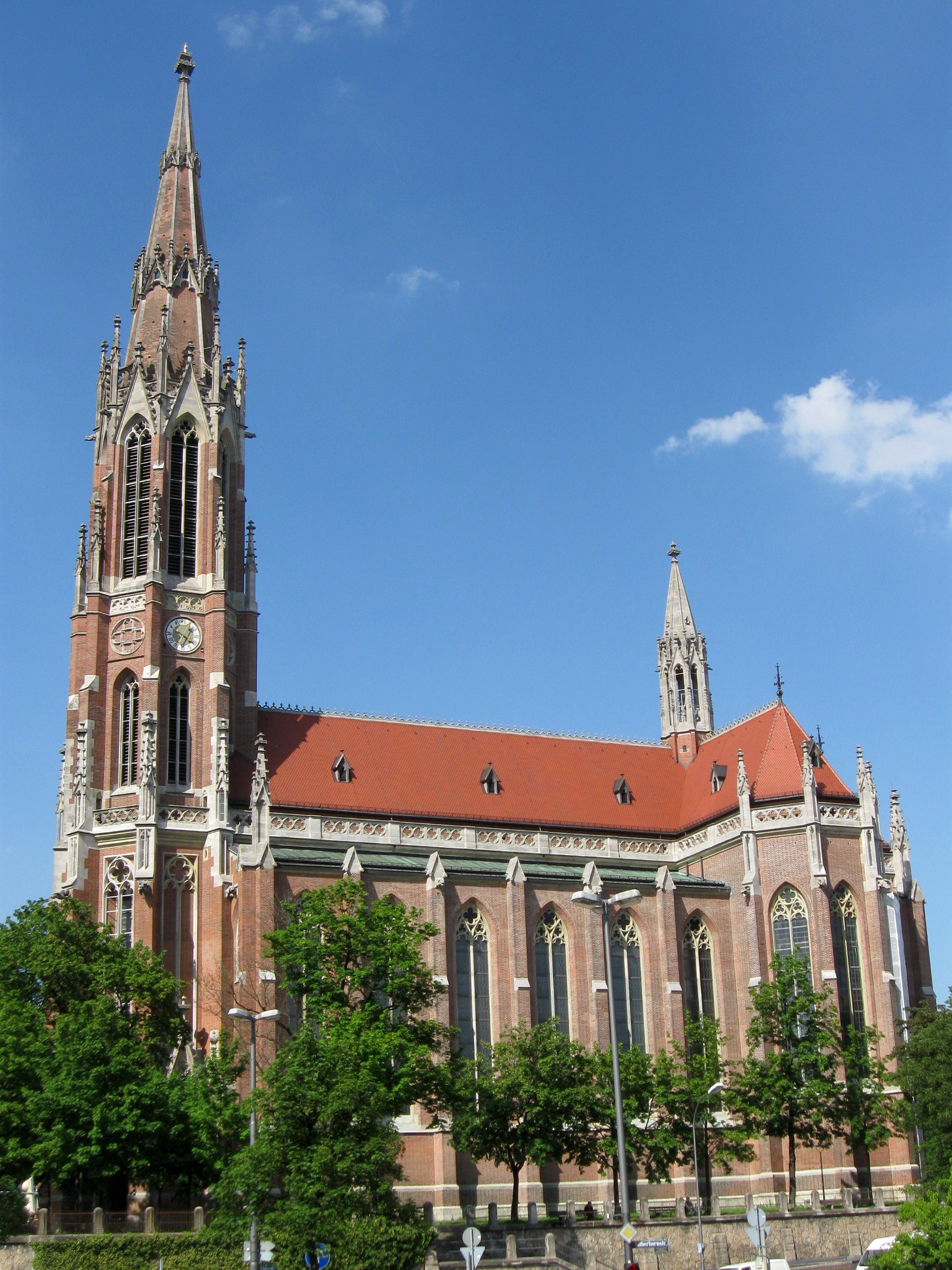
Heilig-Kreuz-Kirche

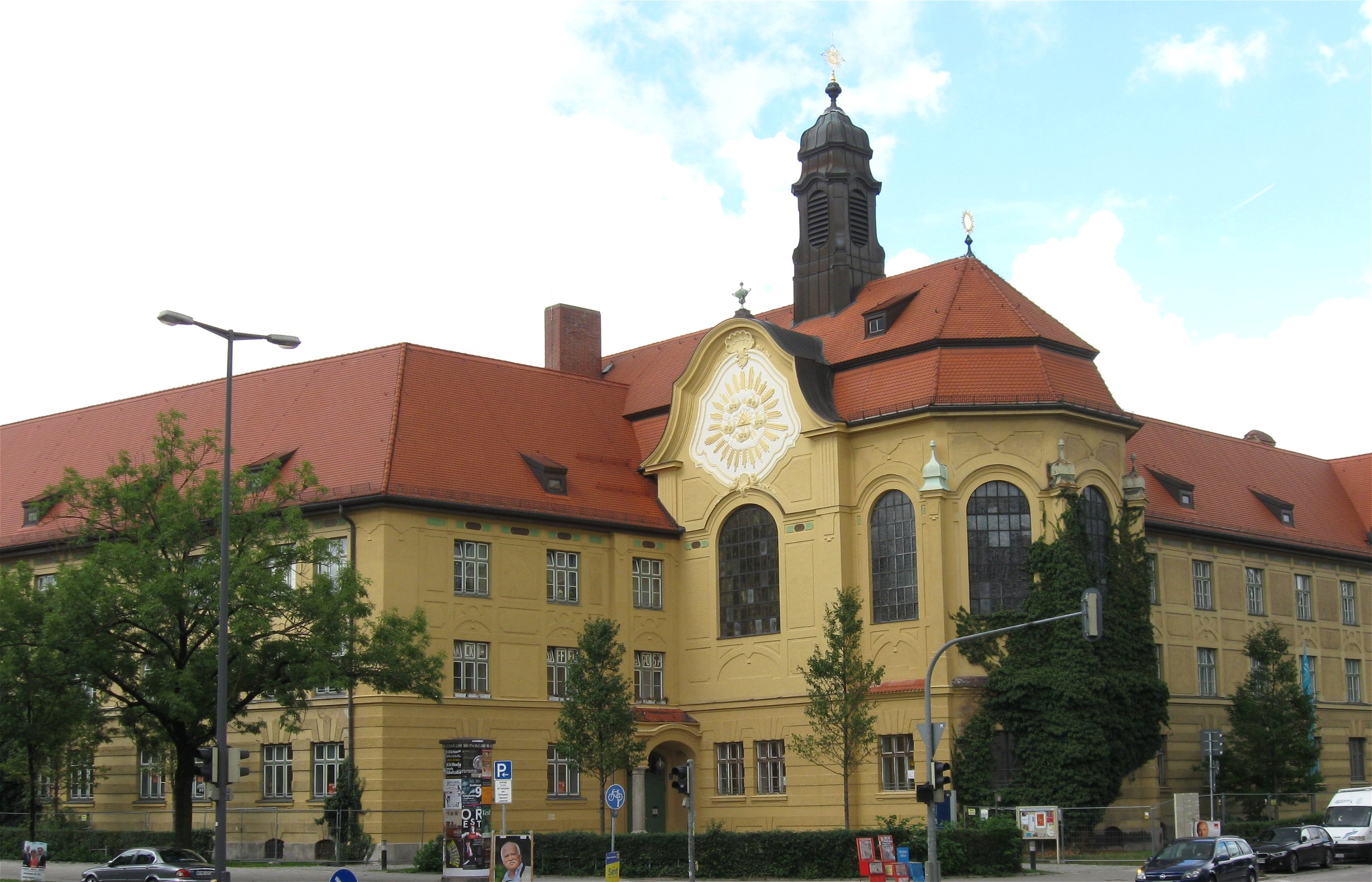
Altenheim St. Martin

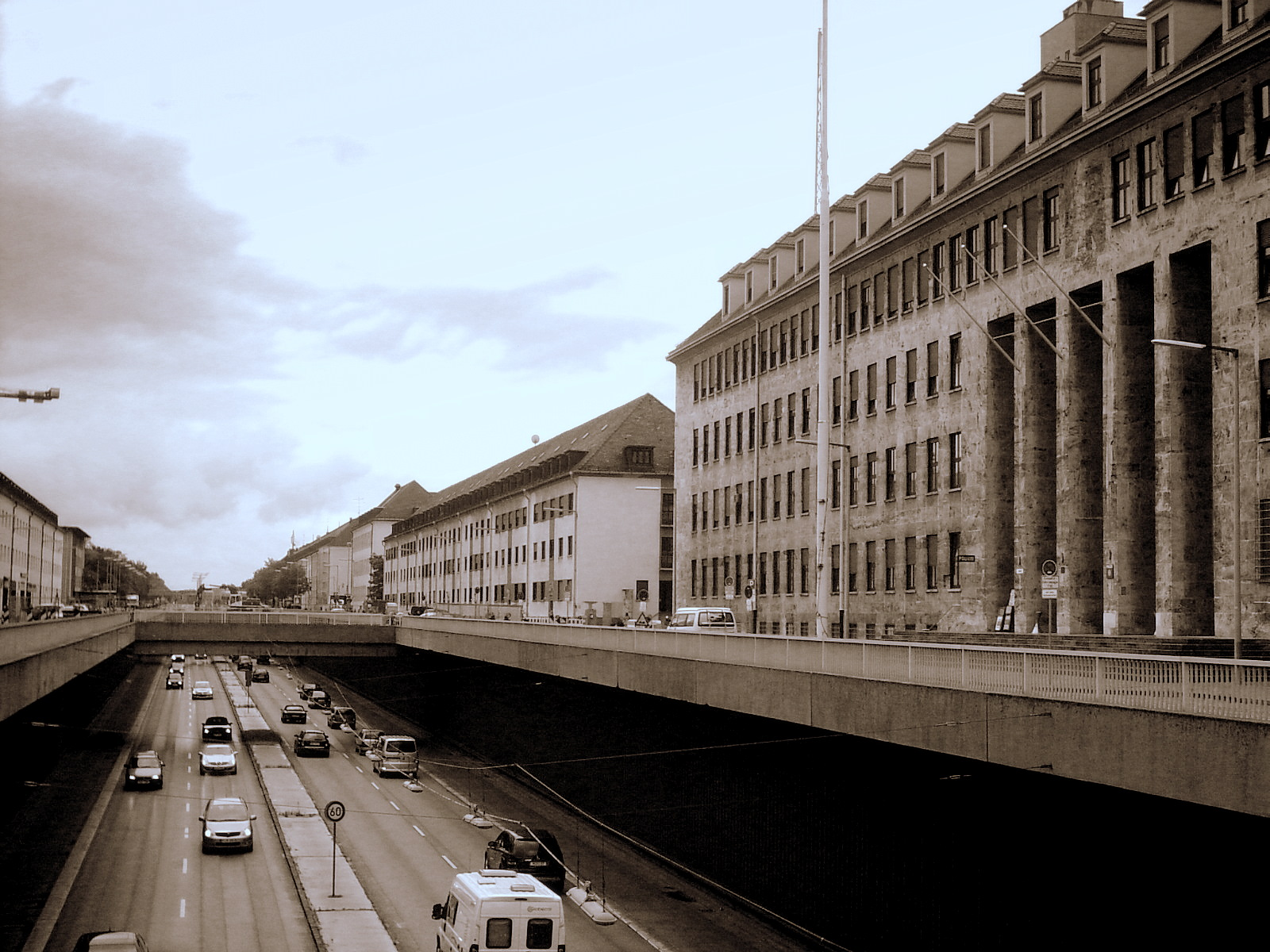
McGraw-Kaserne

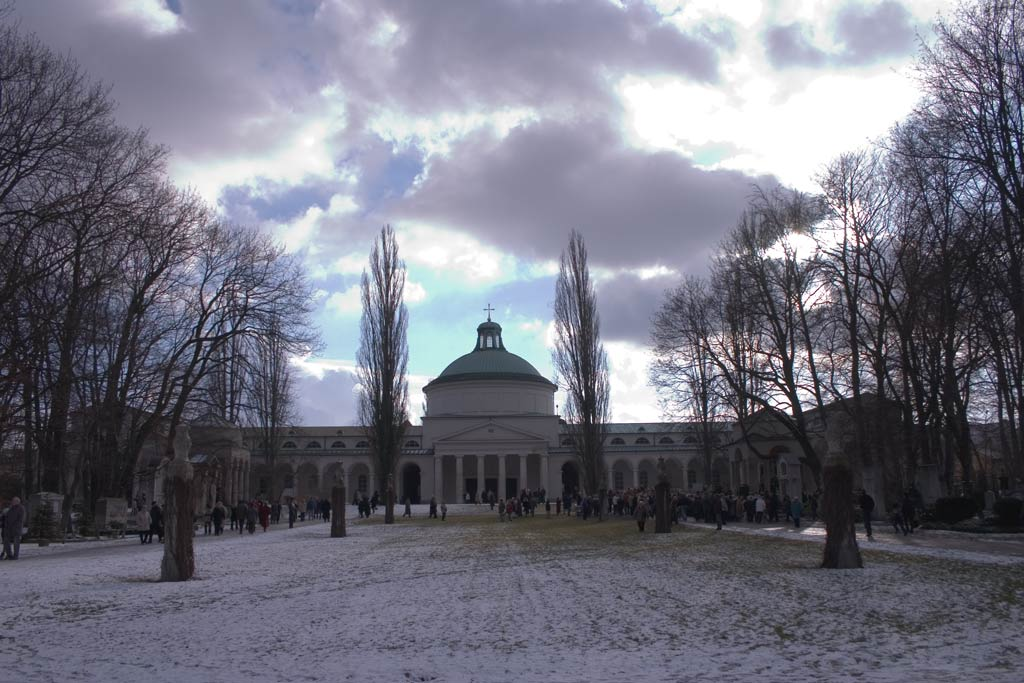
Ostfriedhof

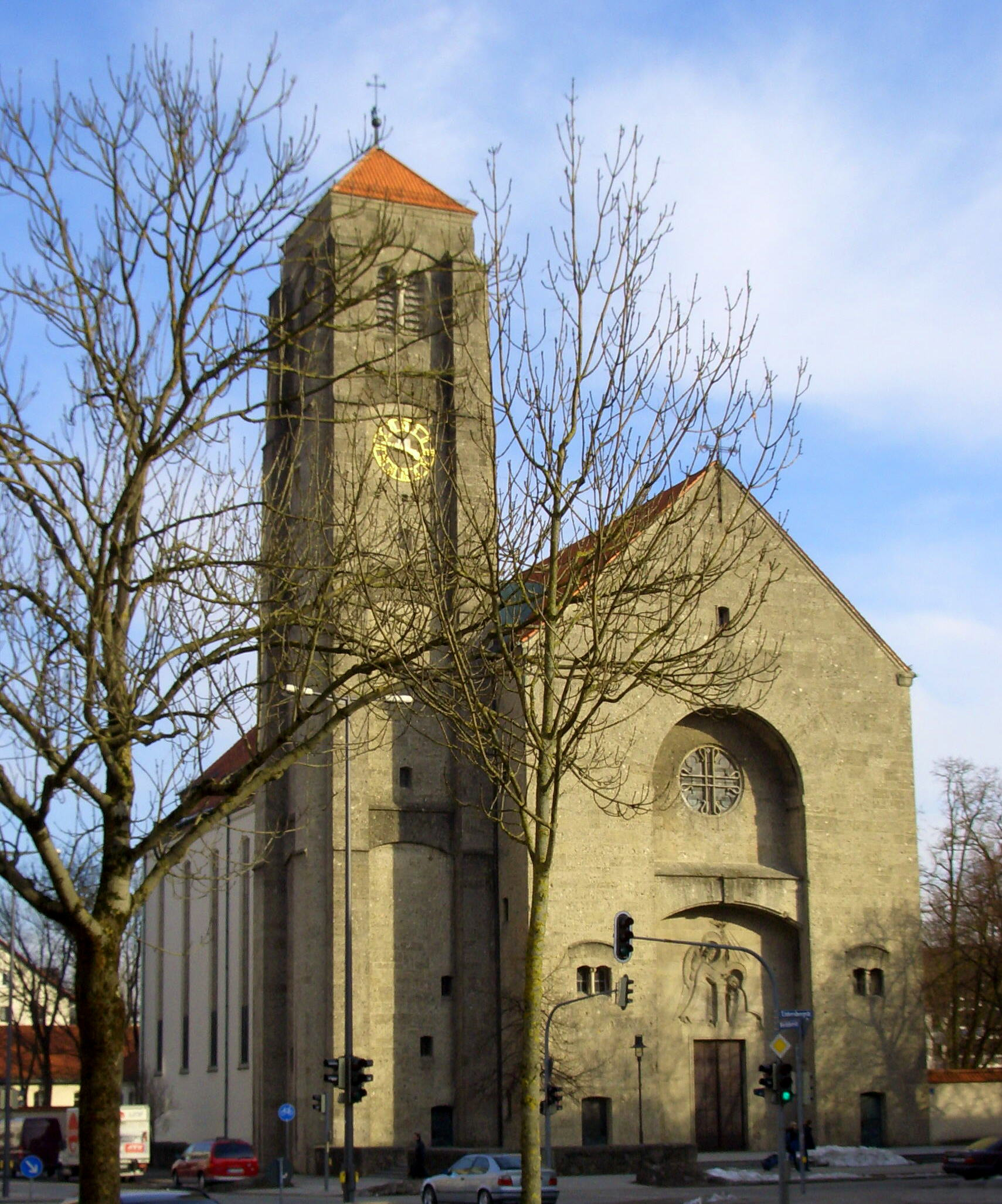
Maria Königin des Friedens

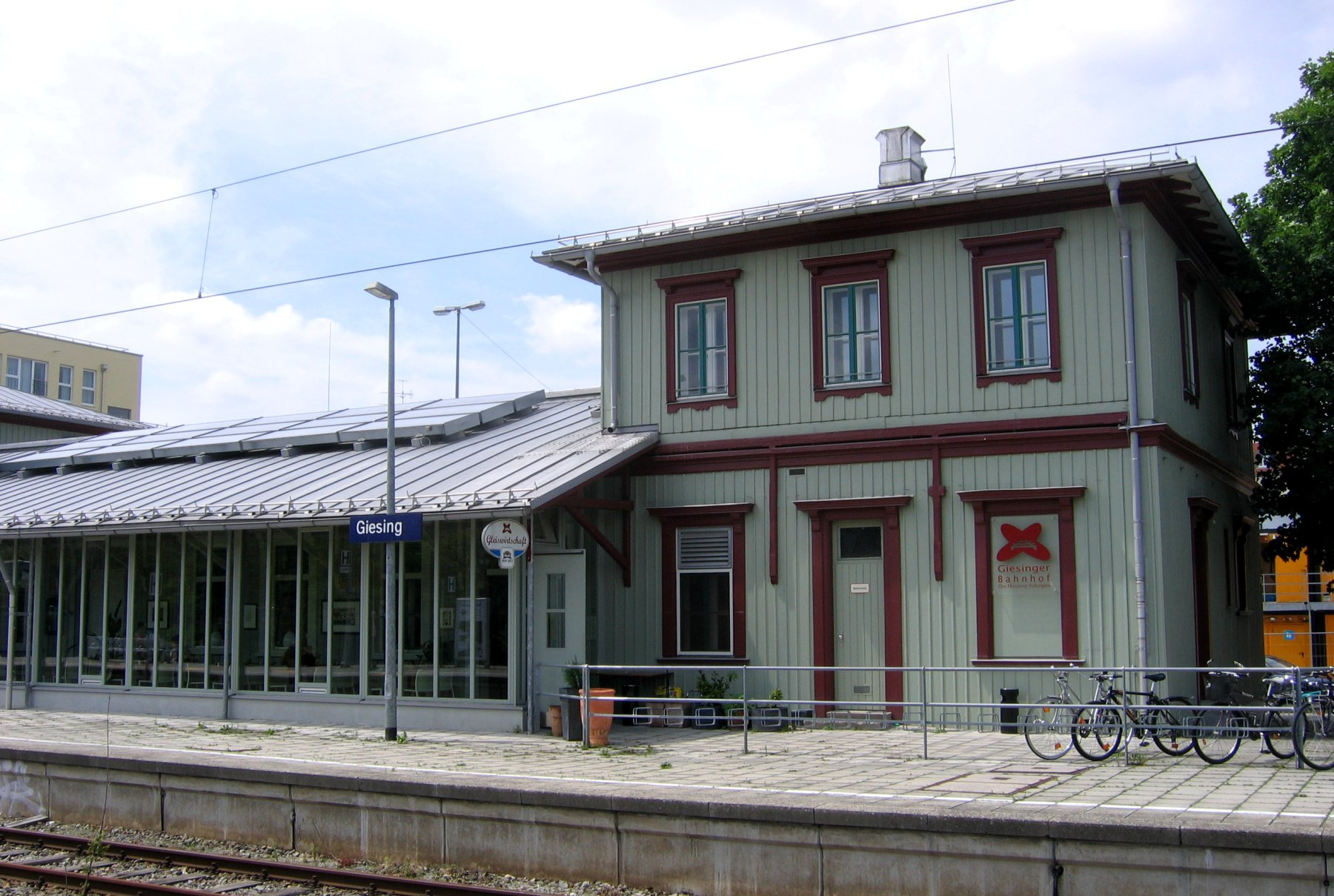
Giesinger Bahnhof

=== 20 – Hadern ===
Cycle tour from the centre of Großhadern via the forest cemetery to the Großhadern clinic: Großhadern village centre, Weißes Bräuhaus, St. Peter village church, TSV München-Großhadern von 1926 e. V., Canisius school, St. Canisius parish church, small house colony Munich-Southwest (villa colony), Georg Hirschfeld, Kurt Eisner, Gastwirtschaft Waldschlösschen, Waldfriedhof, Waldheim, Klinikum Großhadern.

Cycle tour from the former Grosshadern town hall via Kleinhadern and the Blumenau to Neuhadern: Former Großhadern town hall, Ludwig Hunger Werkzeug- und Maschinenfabrik GmbH, old school building, former distillery, Stürzerhof, Blumenau, Kleinhadern housing estate and Corpus Christi parish church, spa gardens housing estate, Augustinum residential home, Neuhadern housing estate, Reformations-Gedächtnis-Kirche.

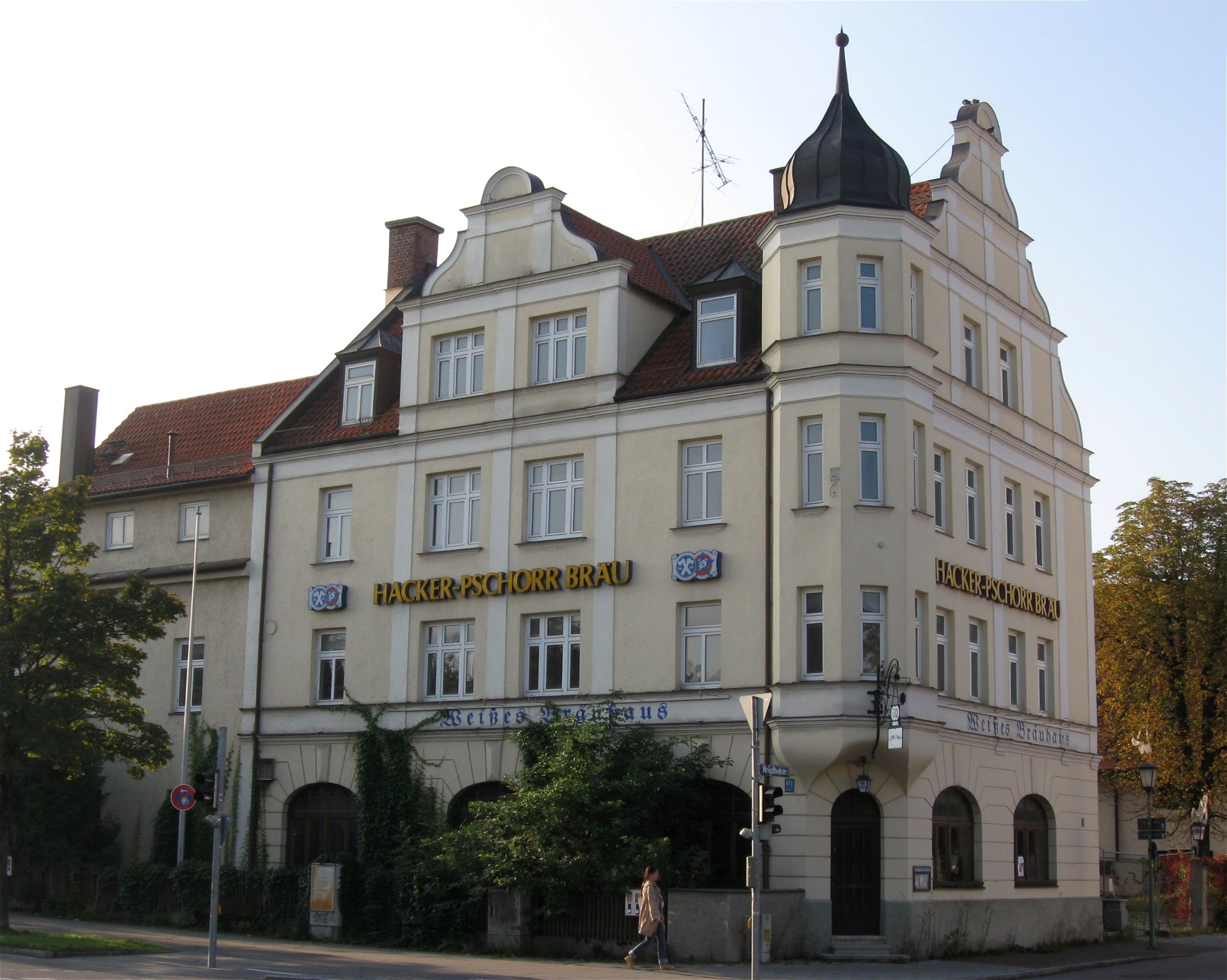
Weißes Bräuhaus

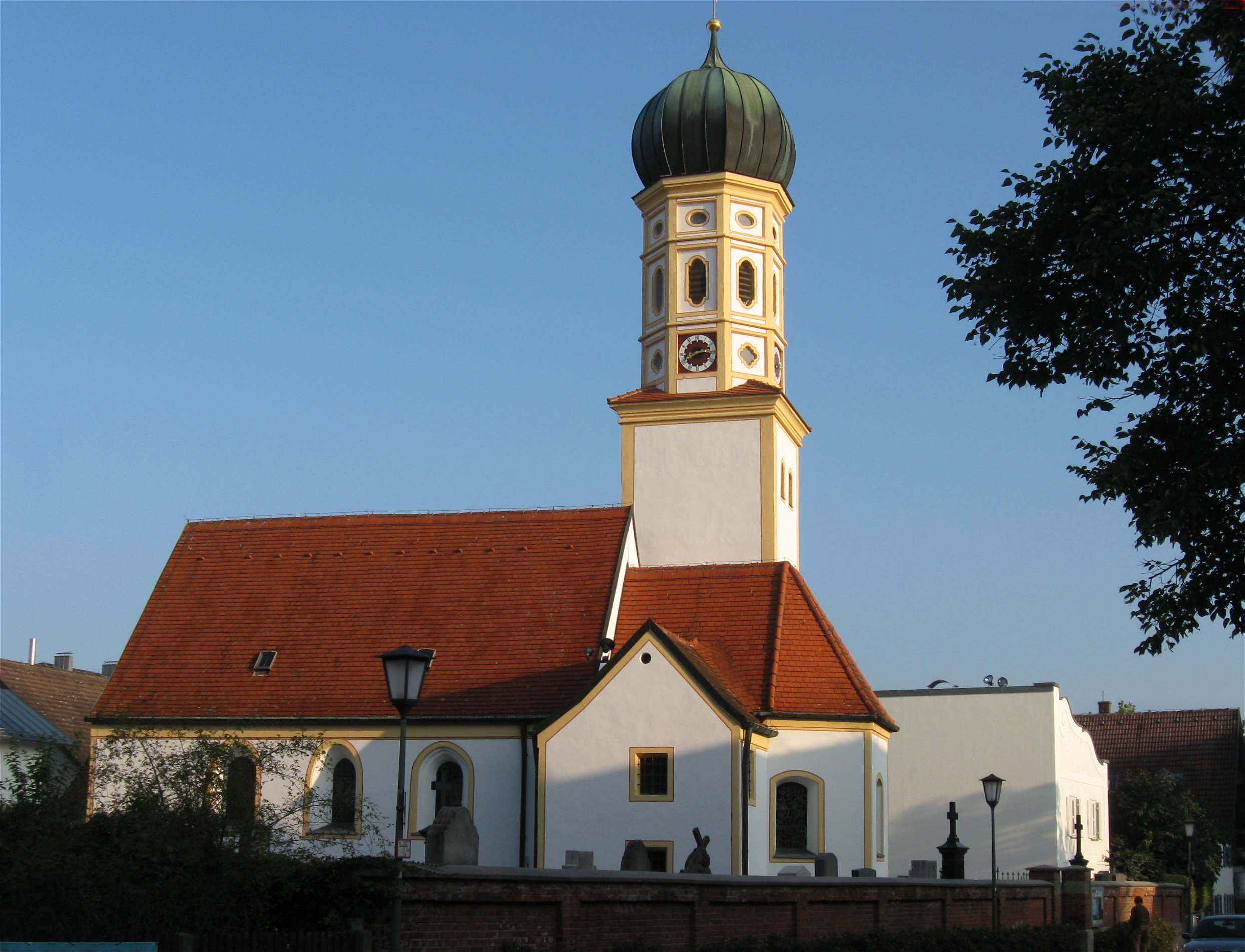
St. Peter

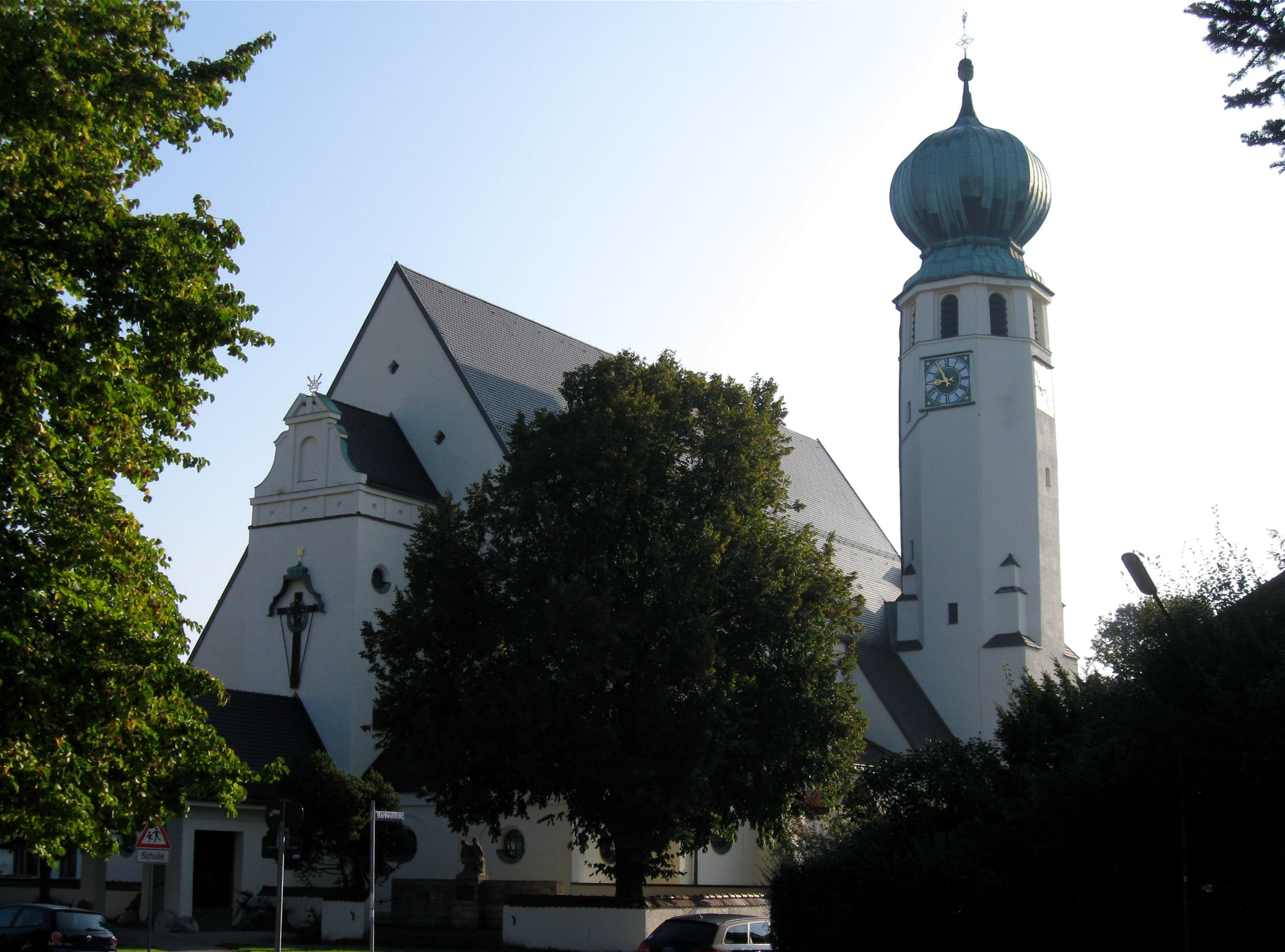
St. Canisius

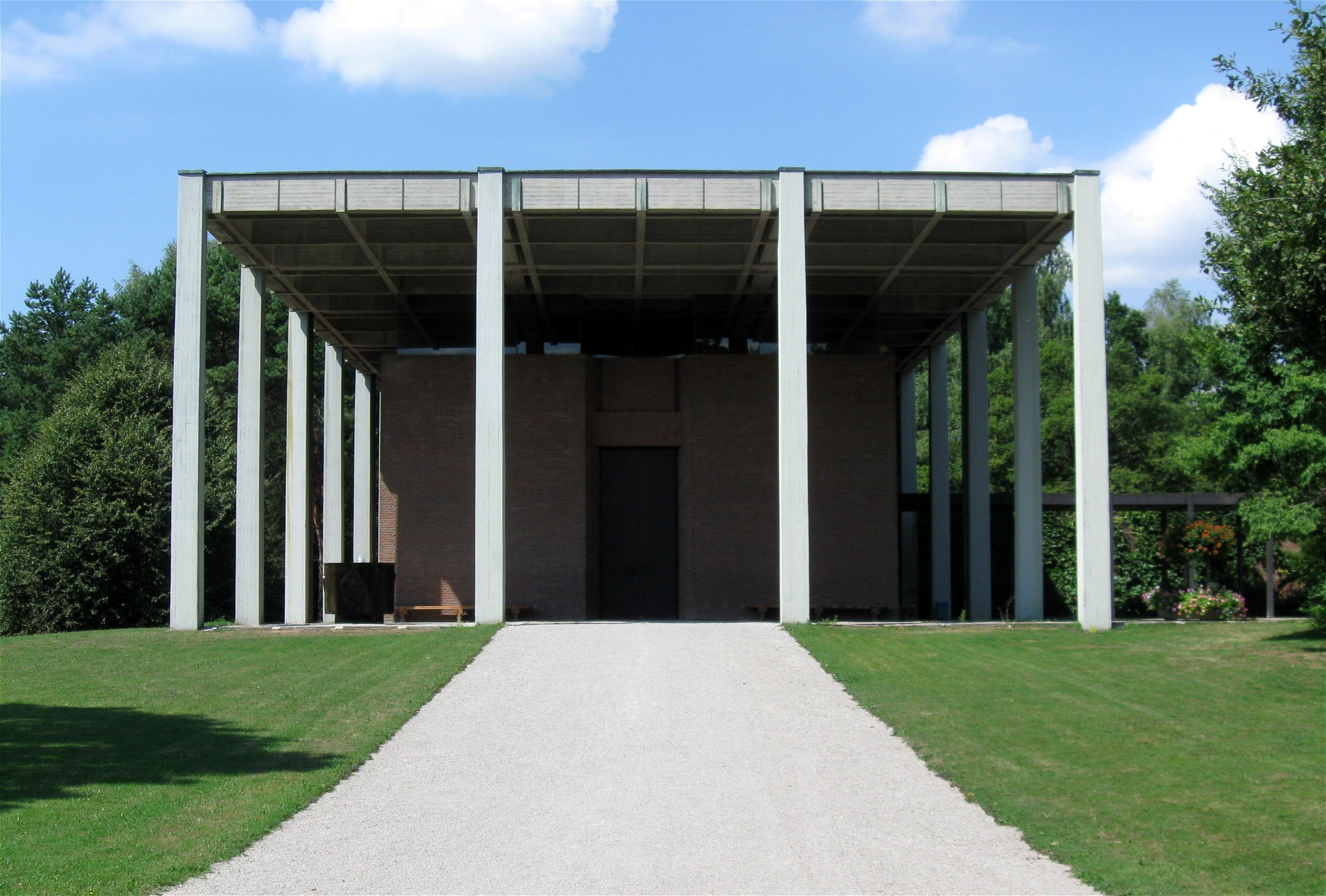
Waldfriedhof

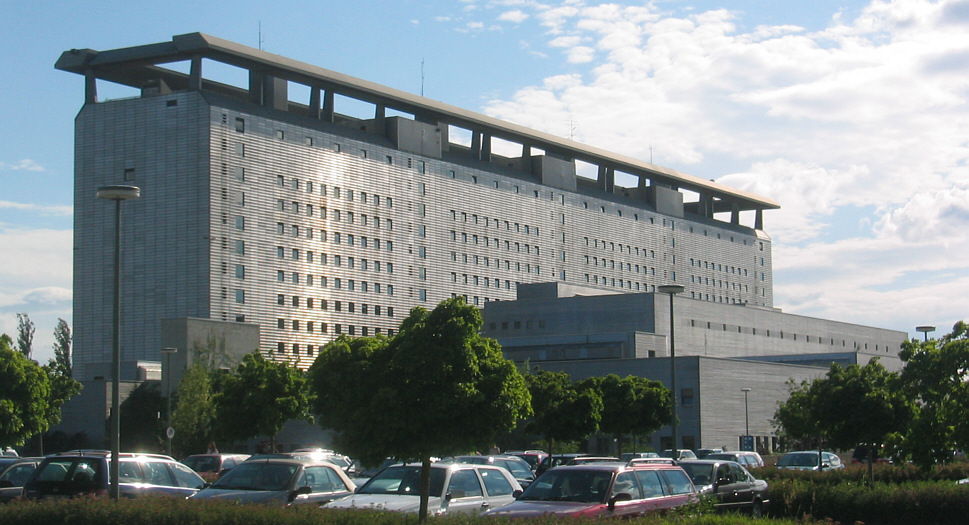
Klinikum Großhadern

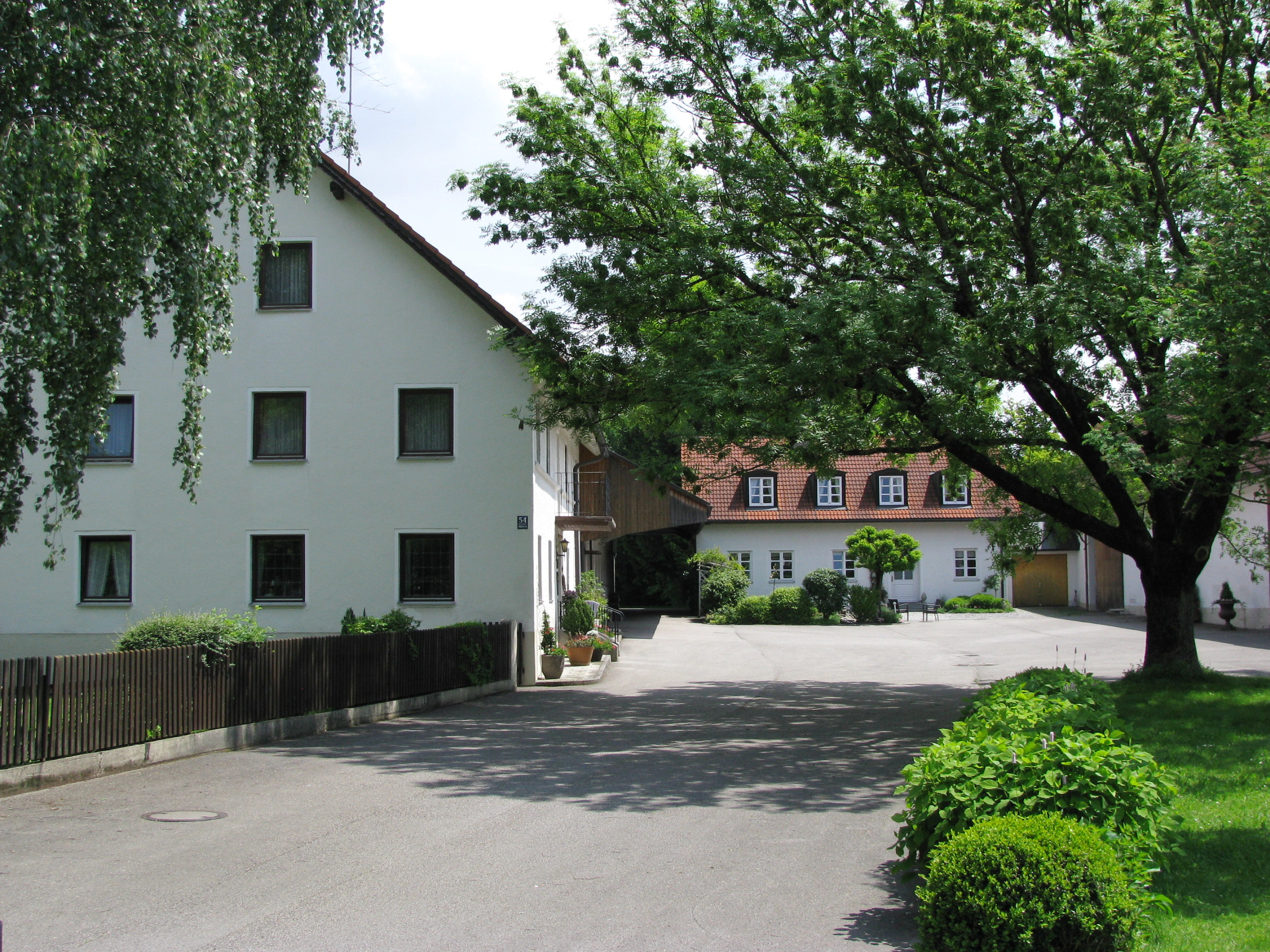
Stürzerhof

=== 21 – Pasing-Obermenzing ===
The "urban" path: Pasing railway station, Pasinger Marienplatz, Pasinger Rathaus, Am Knie, Ebenböckhaus, Altes Rathaus, Institut der Englischen Fräulein, Kirche Mariä Geburt, Steinerweg, Avenariusplatz, Schulstadt Pasing, Anna Croissant-Rust.

The "green" path: Pasing railway station, Pasinger Fabrik, Villenkolonie Pasing I, cooperative settlement, Nymphenburger Kanal, Durchblickpark, Obermenzing village centre, Carlhäusl, Schloss Blutenburg, Pipping, Villenkolonie Pasing II.

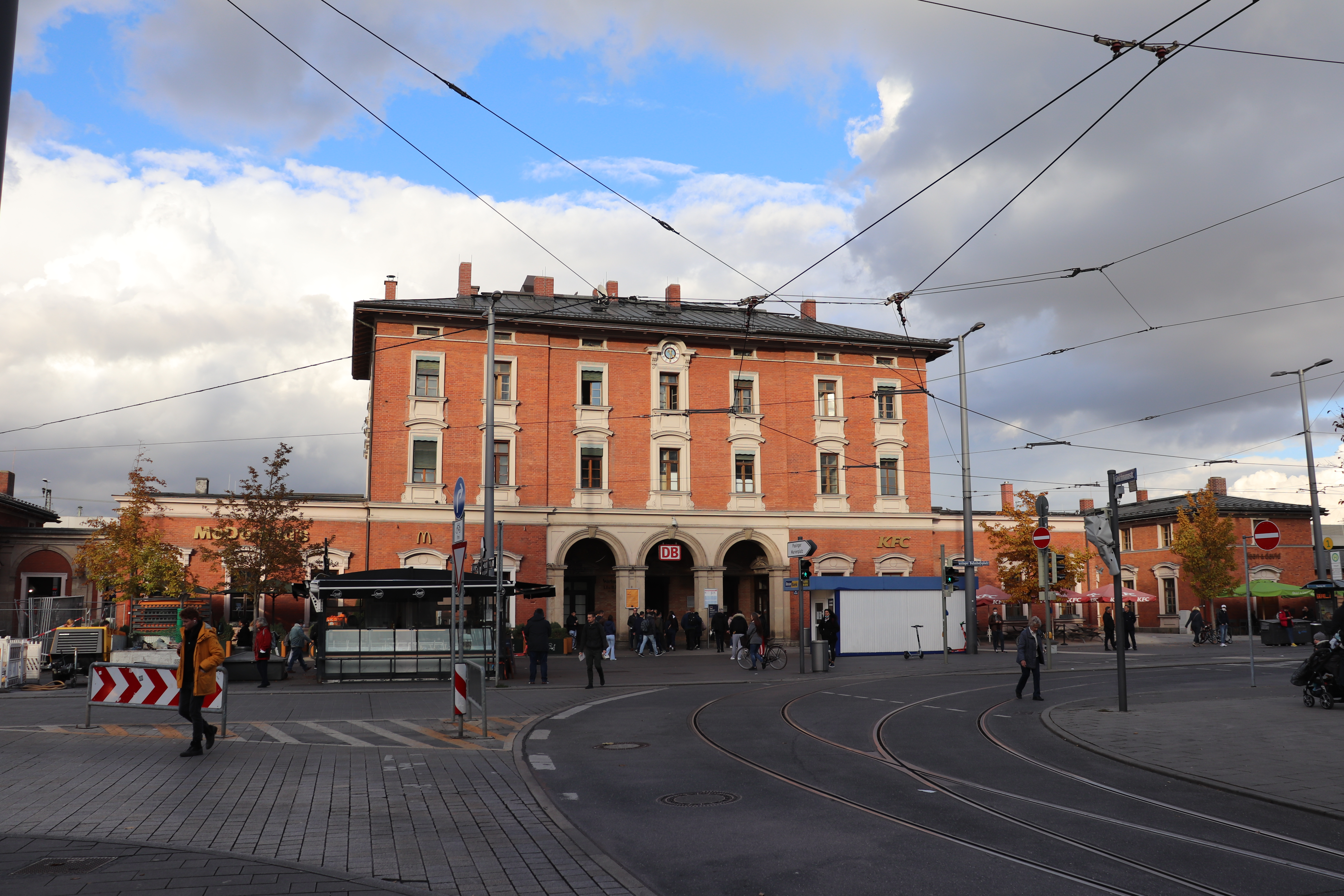
Pasing railway station

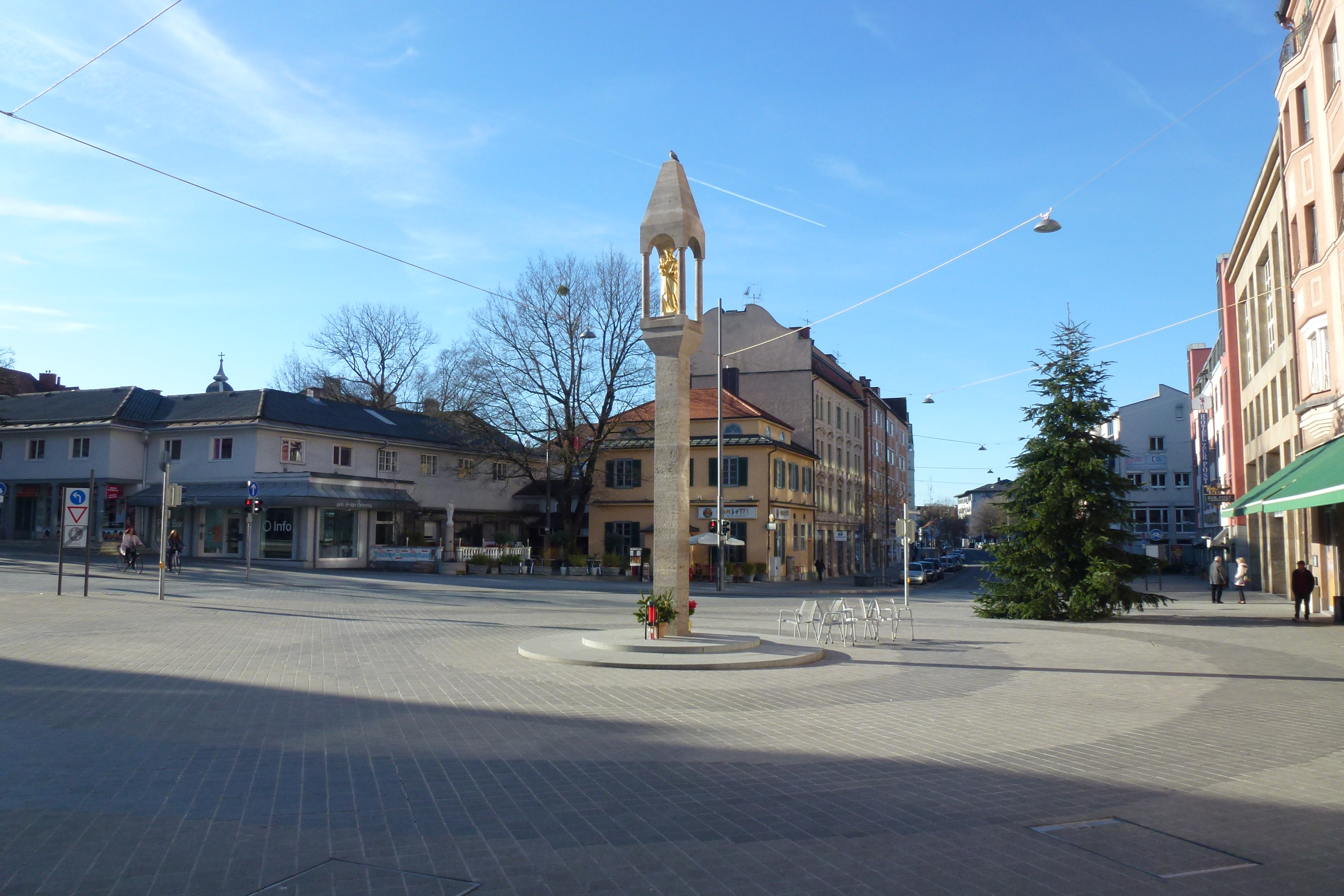
Pasinger Marienplatz

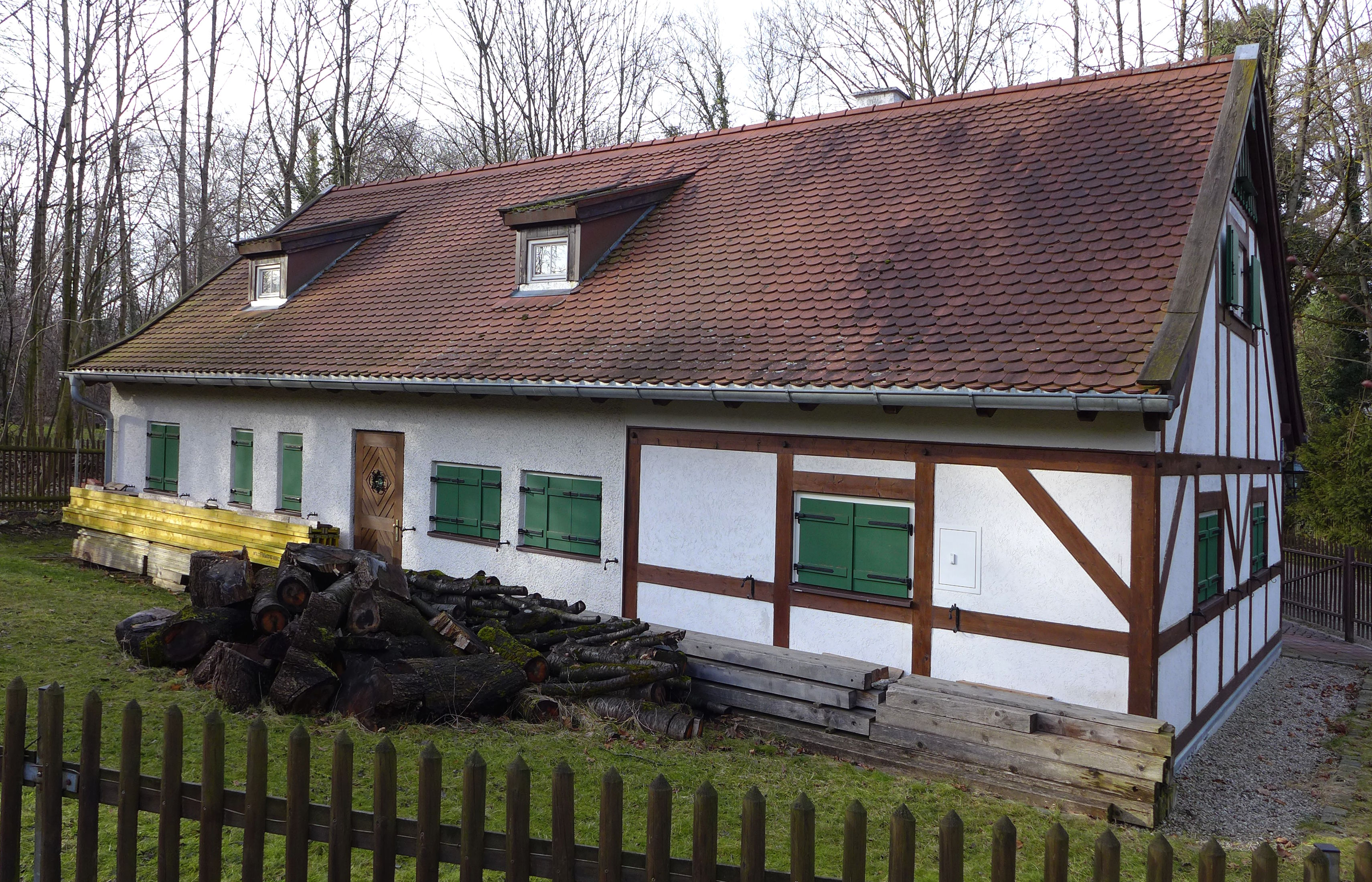
Carlhäusl

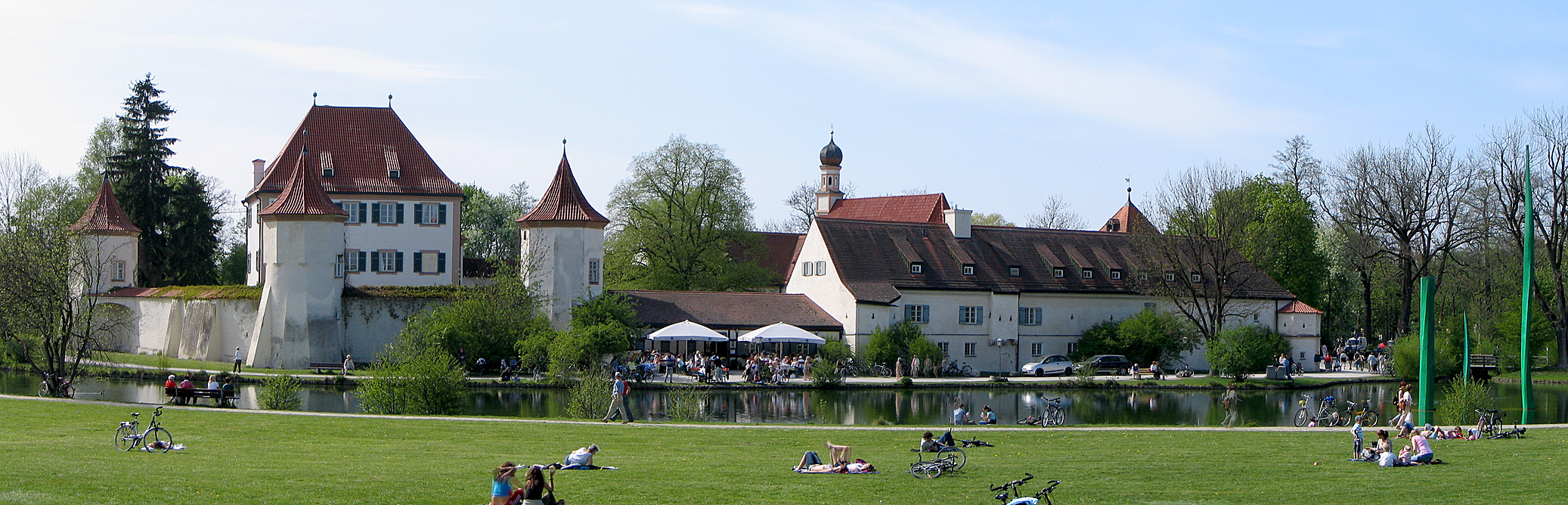
Schloss Blutenburg

=== 22 – Aubing-Lochhausen-Langwied ===
Walk through the old village of Aubing: St. Quirin parish church, former Sedlmayr railway station tavern, Beim Neumaier, former school in Ubostraße, Grünwald inn and tavern, Leingärtner farm, old school building, Aubing chemical factory, Aubing railway station.

Cycle tour through Neuaubing: Dornier Flugzeugwerke, repair works of the International Sleeping and Dining Car Company, Eisenbahnersiedlung Papinstraße, ESV Sportfreunde München-Neuaubing e.V., Neuaubing Railway Repair Works, Gut Freiham, Ehrenbürgstrasse Forced Labour Camp, Settlement on Gößweinsteinplatz, Neuaubing-West Settlement, Railwaymen's Building Cooperative Settlement, Evangelisch-Lutherische Adventskirche, St. Konrad von Parzham Parish Church, Limesstraße School, Water Tower, Aubing Brickworks, Friedhof Aubing.

Bicycle tour from the settlement Am Westkreuz to the Langwieder Seenplatte: Settlement Am Westkreuz, Aubing-Ost, railway depot with combined heat and power station, Aubinger Lohe, brickworks Lochhausen, railway station Lochhausen, St. Michael and village centre Lochhausen, Lutheran-Lutheran community centre Bartimäus, village centre Langwied, Langwieder See and Lußsee.

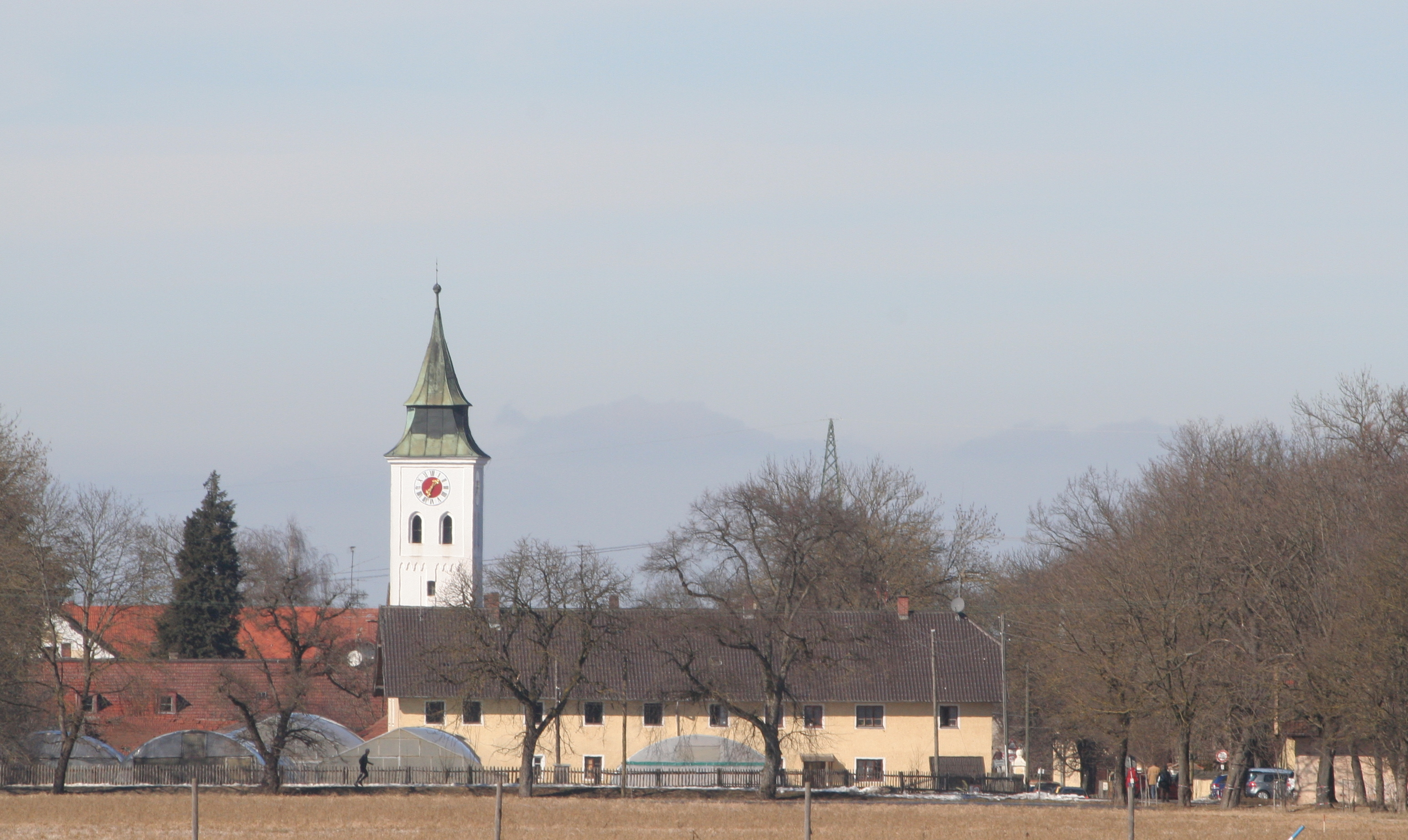
Gut Freiham

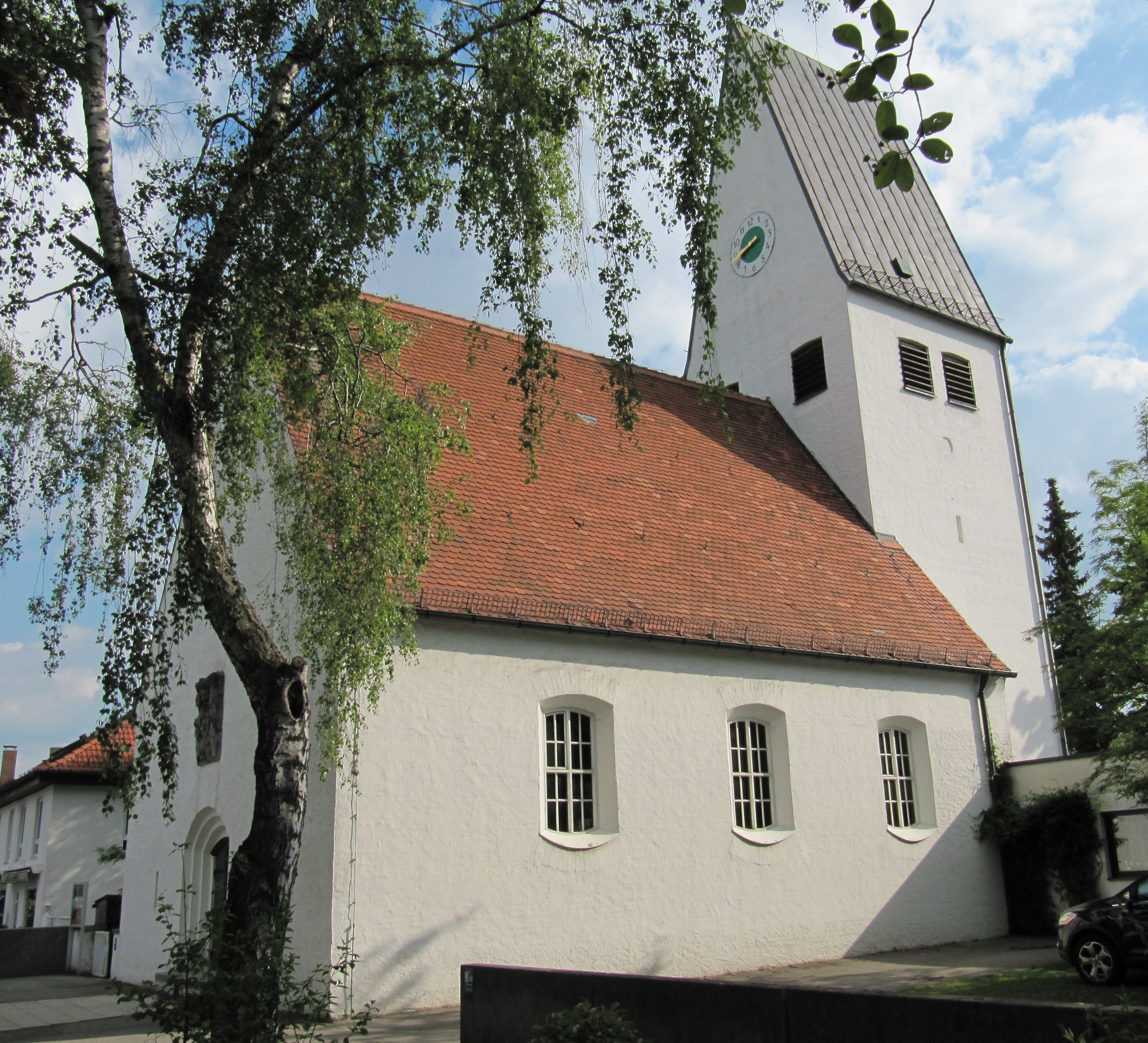
Adventskirche

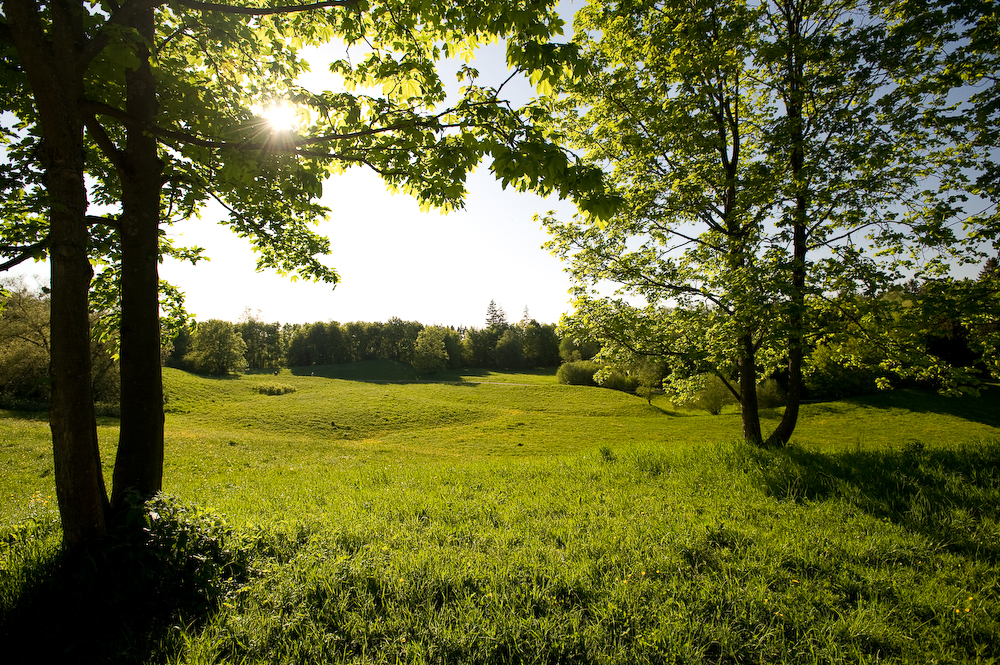
Aubinger Lohe

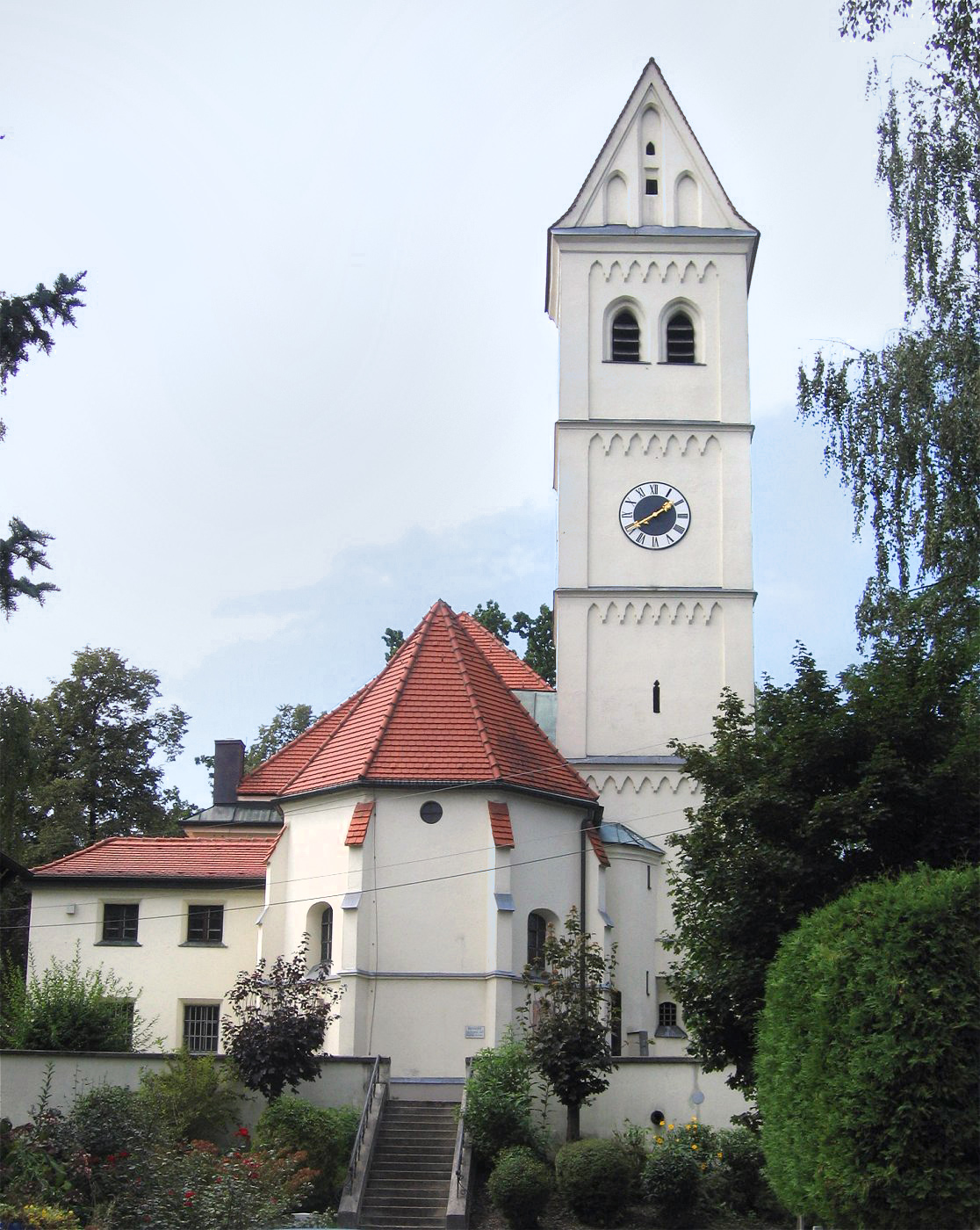
St. Michael
Lochhausen

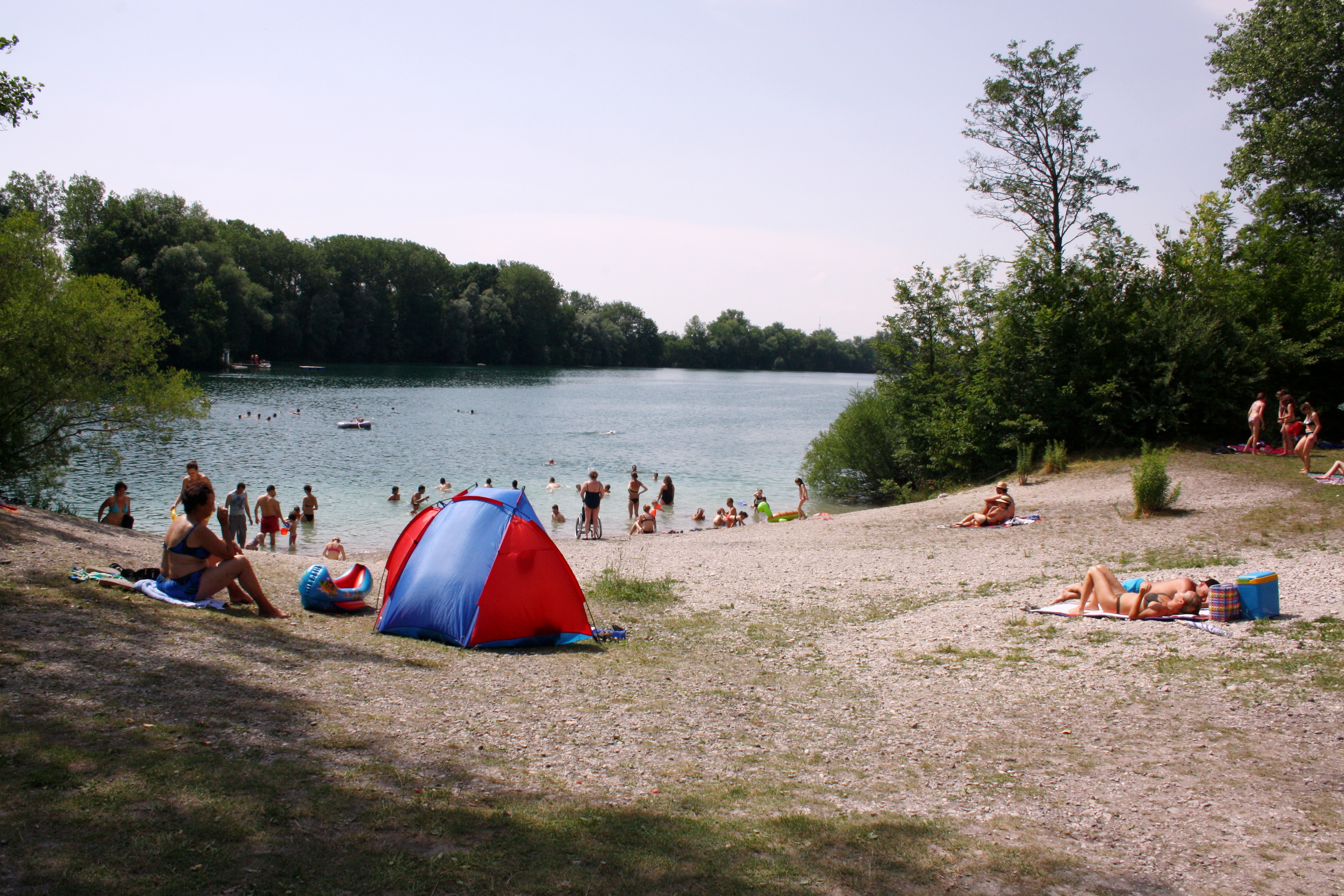
Langwieder See

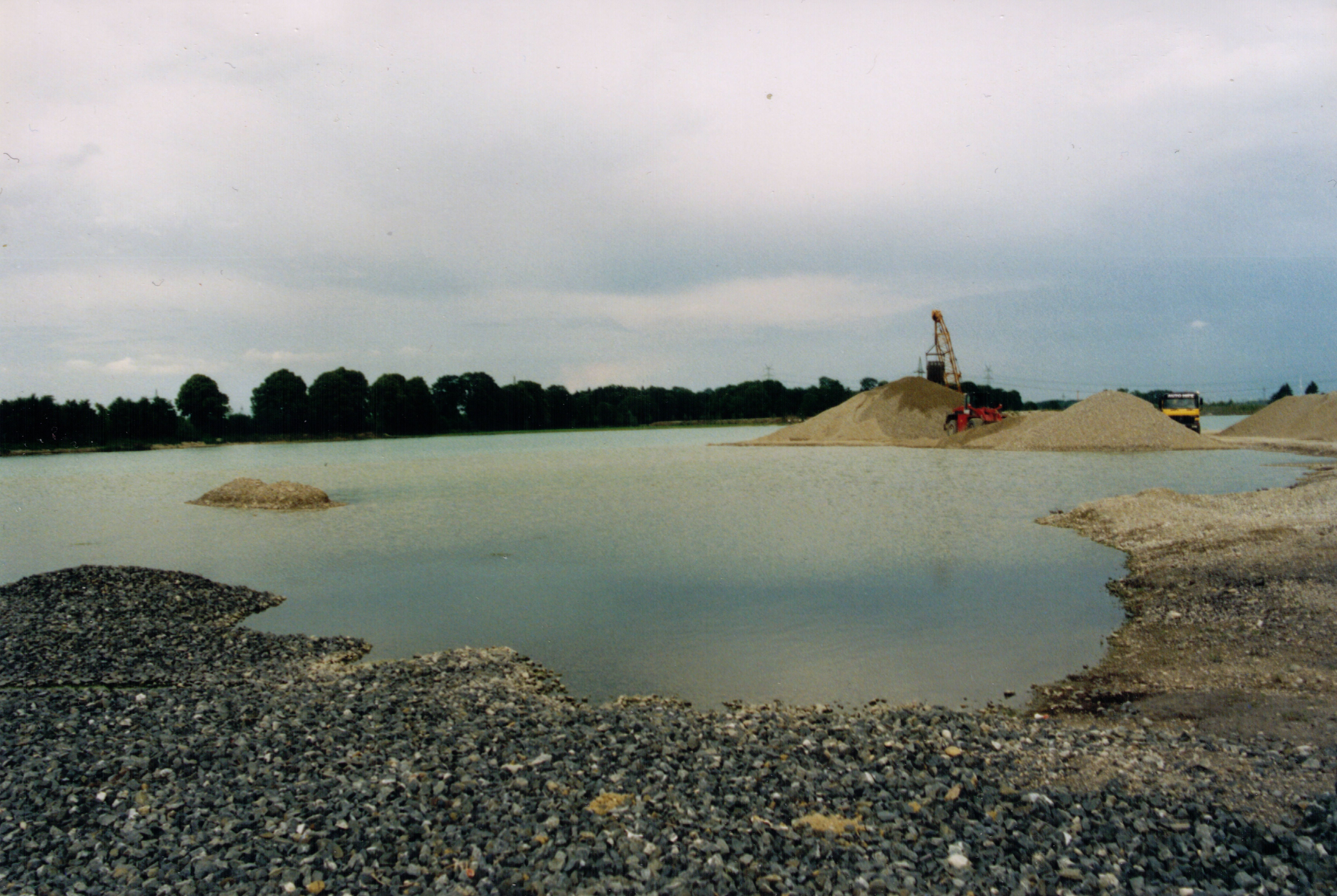
Lußsee

=== 23 - Allach-Untermenzing ===
From the Hauser Schloss to the shooting range: Hauser Schloss, industry in Allach Forestry: BMW, MAN and MTU, Allach recreation area/former Allach summer swimming pool, Lochholz, Reichsautobahn route/dry biotope gravel route, shooting range and royal private fire protection company Der Bund.

Walk through Allach - from farming village to industrial location: St. Peter and Paul, elementary school at Eversbuschstraße 182, Tafernwirtschaft Beim Wirt, Maria Himmelfahrt parish church, Sep-Ruf-Bauten, Epiphanias church, Allach railway station, Diamalt, Sager & Woerner, Junkers Werk.

Cycle tour through Untermenzing - from the old village via Angerlohe to Krauss-Maffei in Allach: Inselmühle, St. Martin, school centre Untermenzing, tavern Zur Schwaige, the Würm, steam saw and planing mill, "Theodor Kirsch & Söhne", Maria Trost and Angerlohe settlement, Angerlohe, porcelain factory, Krauss-Maffei

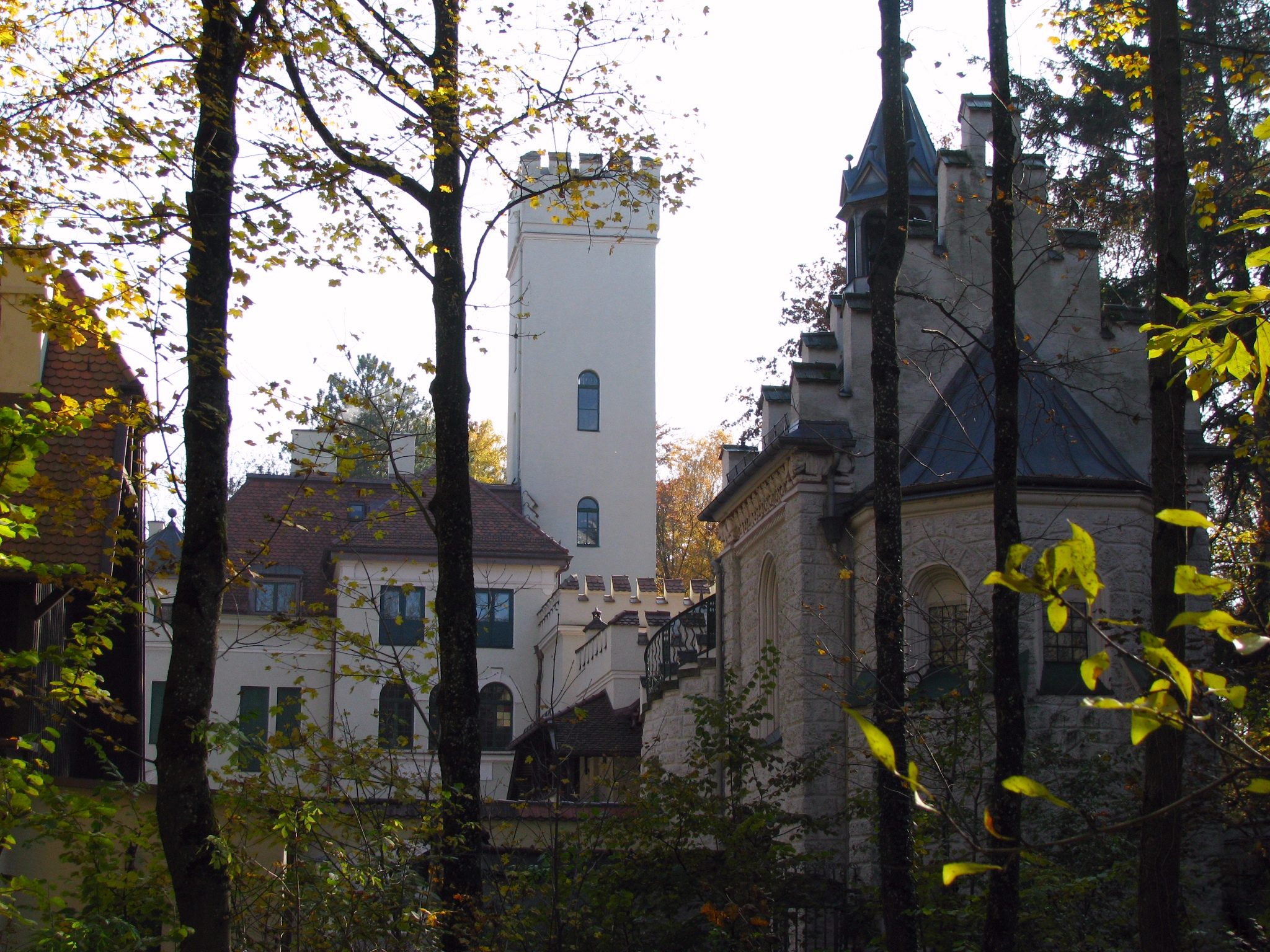
Schloss Allach

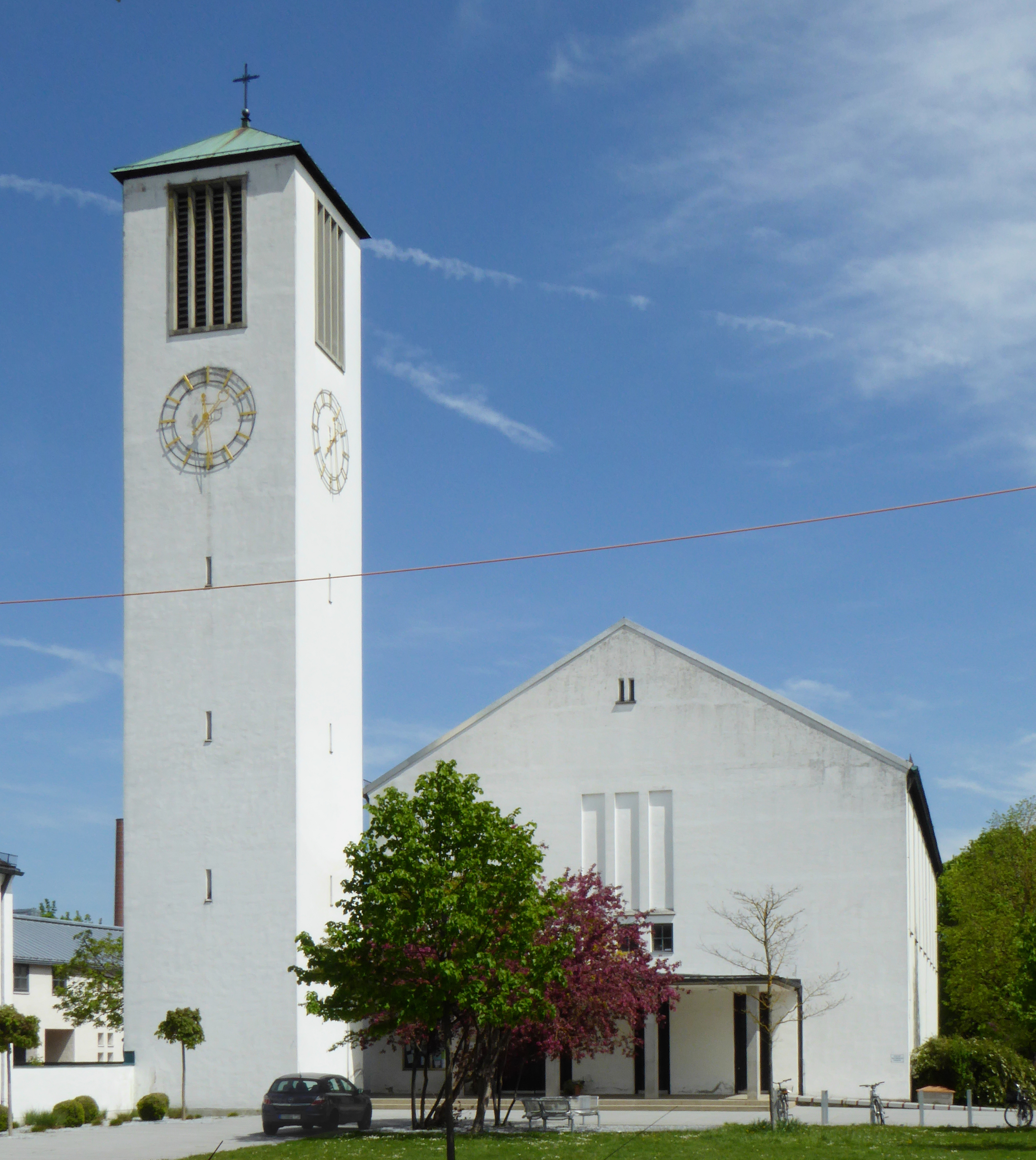
Pfarrkirche Maria Himmelfahrt

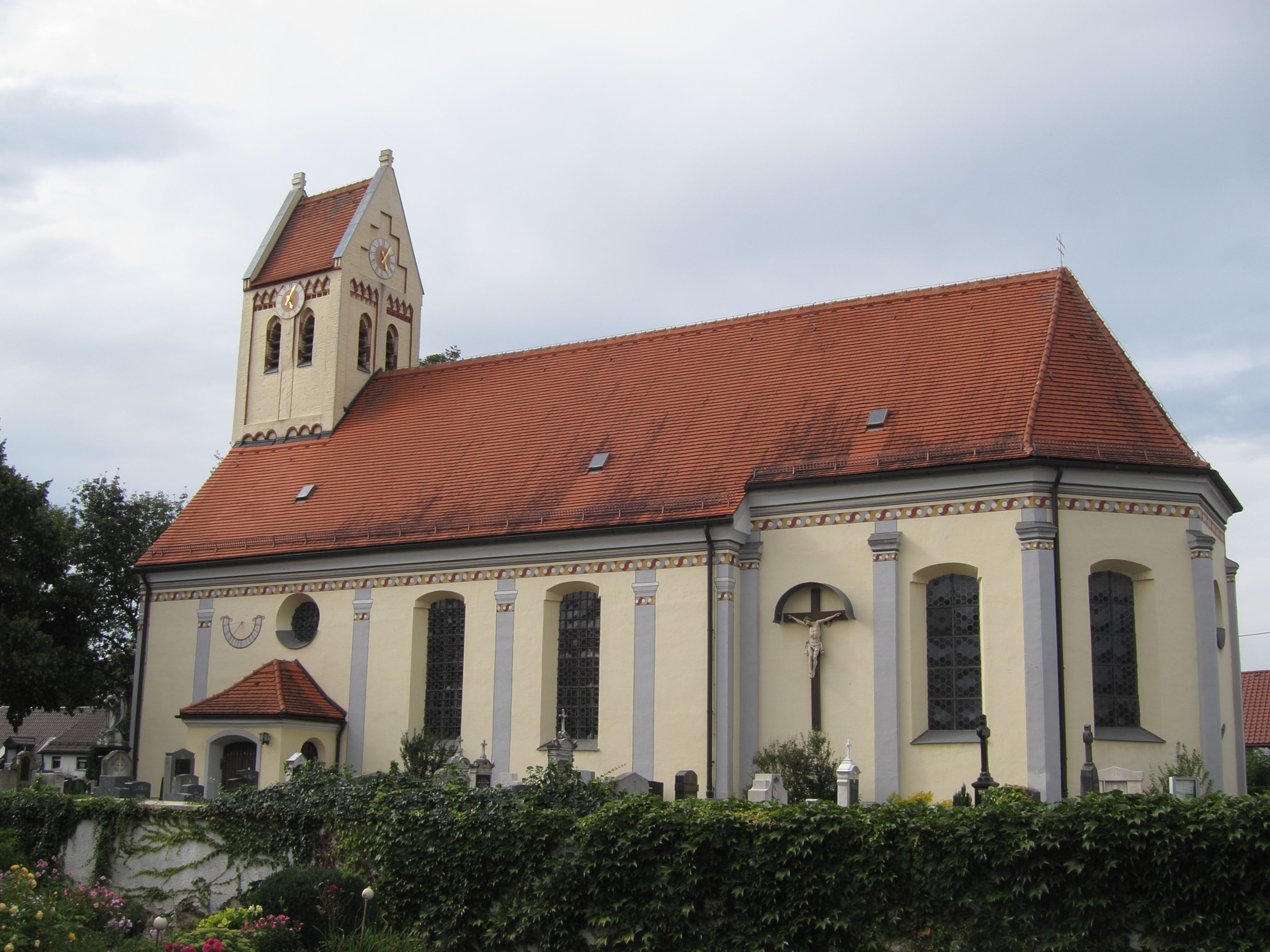
St. Peter und Paul

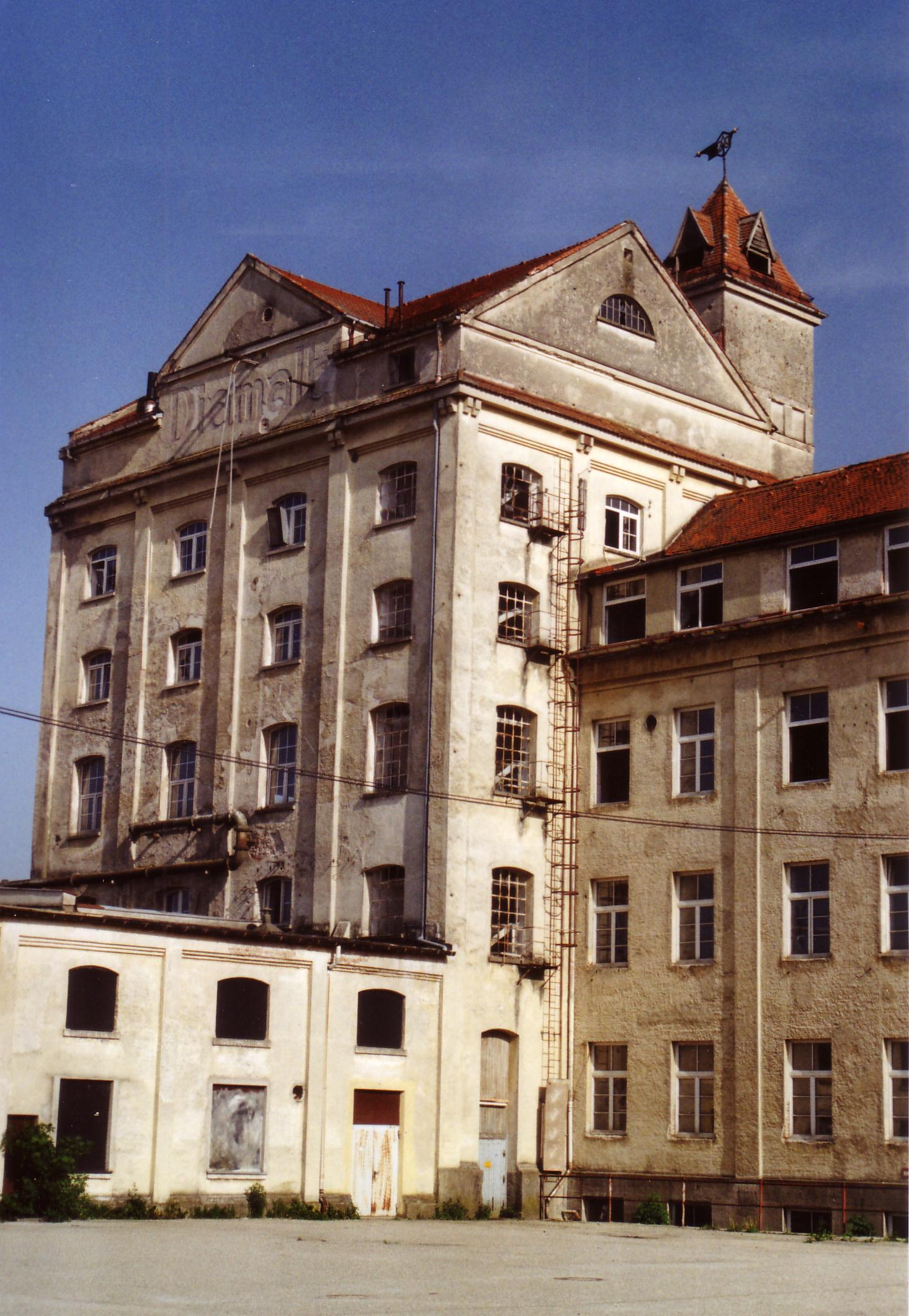
Diamalt

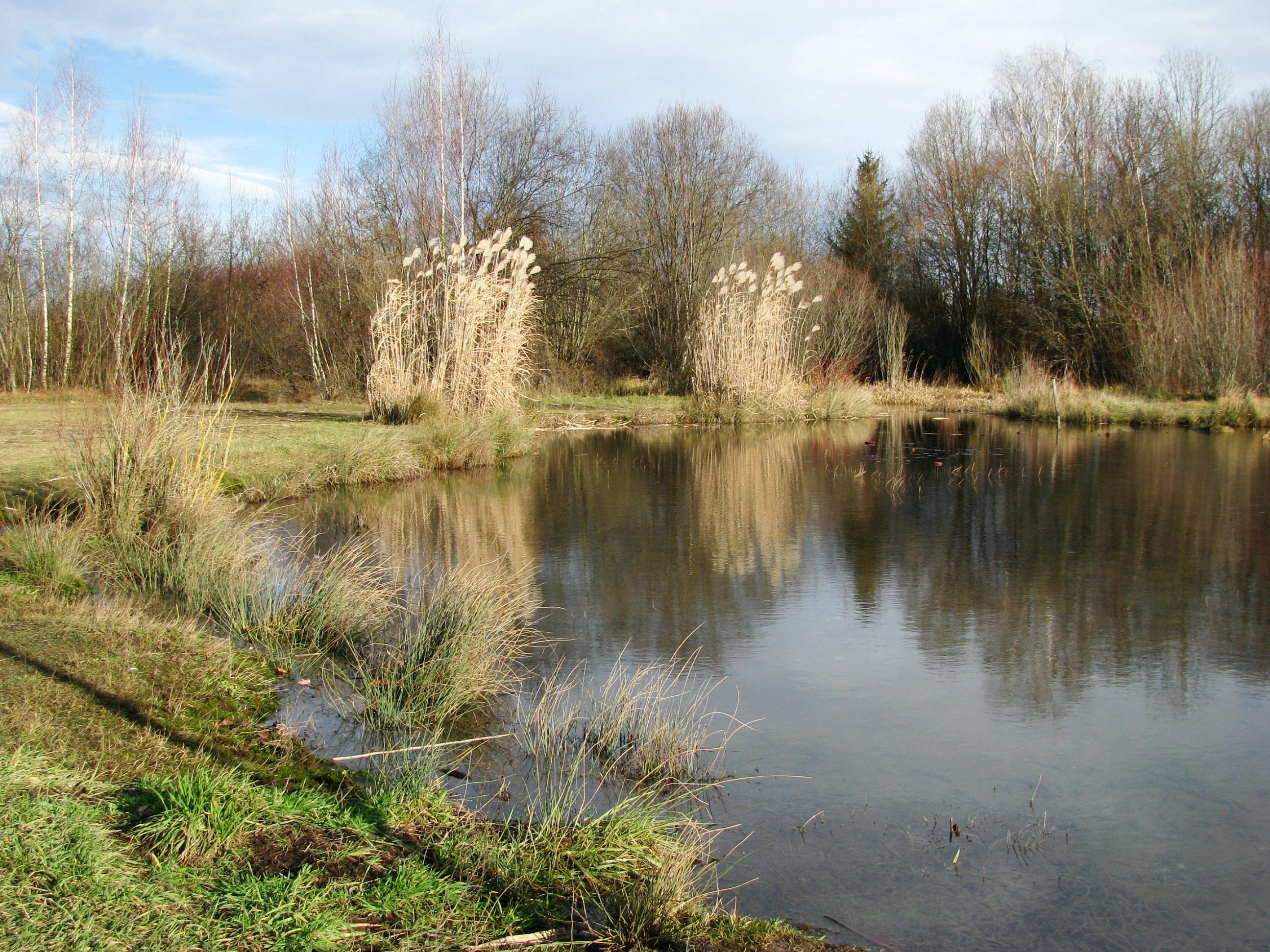
Angerlohe

=== 24 - Feldmoching-Hasenbergl ===
Through the old village of Feldmoching: St. Peter and Paul with the parsonage, Friedhof Feldmoching, war monuments, tavern and community centre, hammer mill (Obermühle), Mittermühle, former Untermühle, school on Lerchenauer Straße, Bethanienkirche, Josef-Frankl-Straße with railway station.

Through the Hasenbergl housing estate: Dülferstraße underground station and Dülferanger, Hasenbergl, historical visual axis Schleißheimer Straße, Mariä Sieben Schmerzen und Lichtblick Hasenbergl, accommodation facility Hasenbergl-Nord and social facilities, Evangeliumskirche, St. Nikolaus, Center Hasenbergl and Hasenbergl underground station.

Bicycle tour through the 24th district with its districts: St. Agnes, Pulverturm and Virginia Depot, Willy Brandt Comprehensive School, Hasenbergl-South and Feldmochinger Anger, Augustinum Munich North residential home and Otto Steiner School, 's Dülfer youth recreation home, Herbergstraße, barrack of the former concentration camp subcamp in Ludwigsfeld, Ludwigsfeld housing estate with monument and places of worship, former Ludwigsfeld moor colony, former Gaststätte Lindenhof, St. Christoph, former villa with studio, catholic church St. Johannes Evangelist, Kapernaum-Kirche, former cooperative settlement Eggarten.

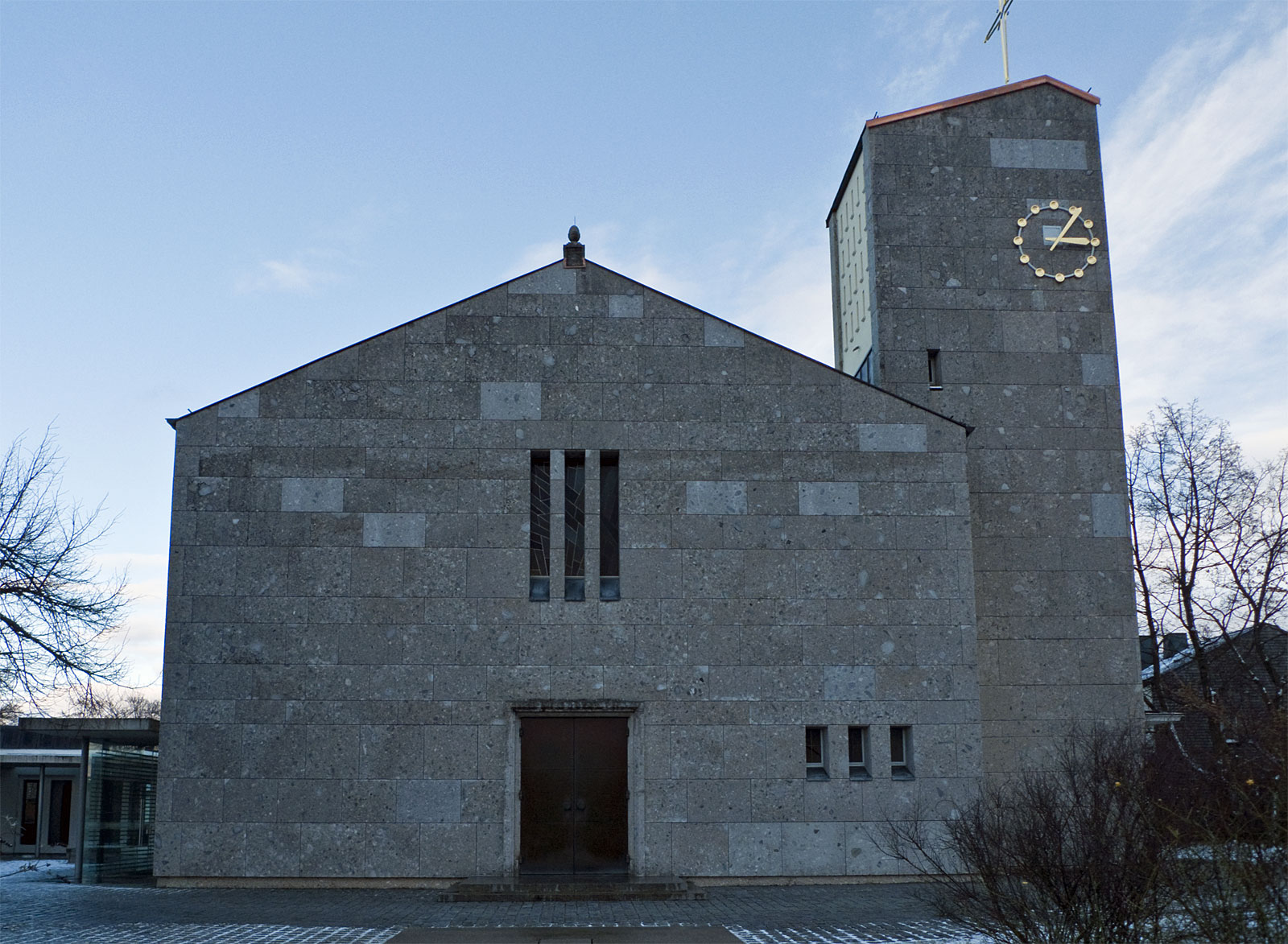
St. Agnes

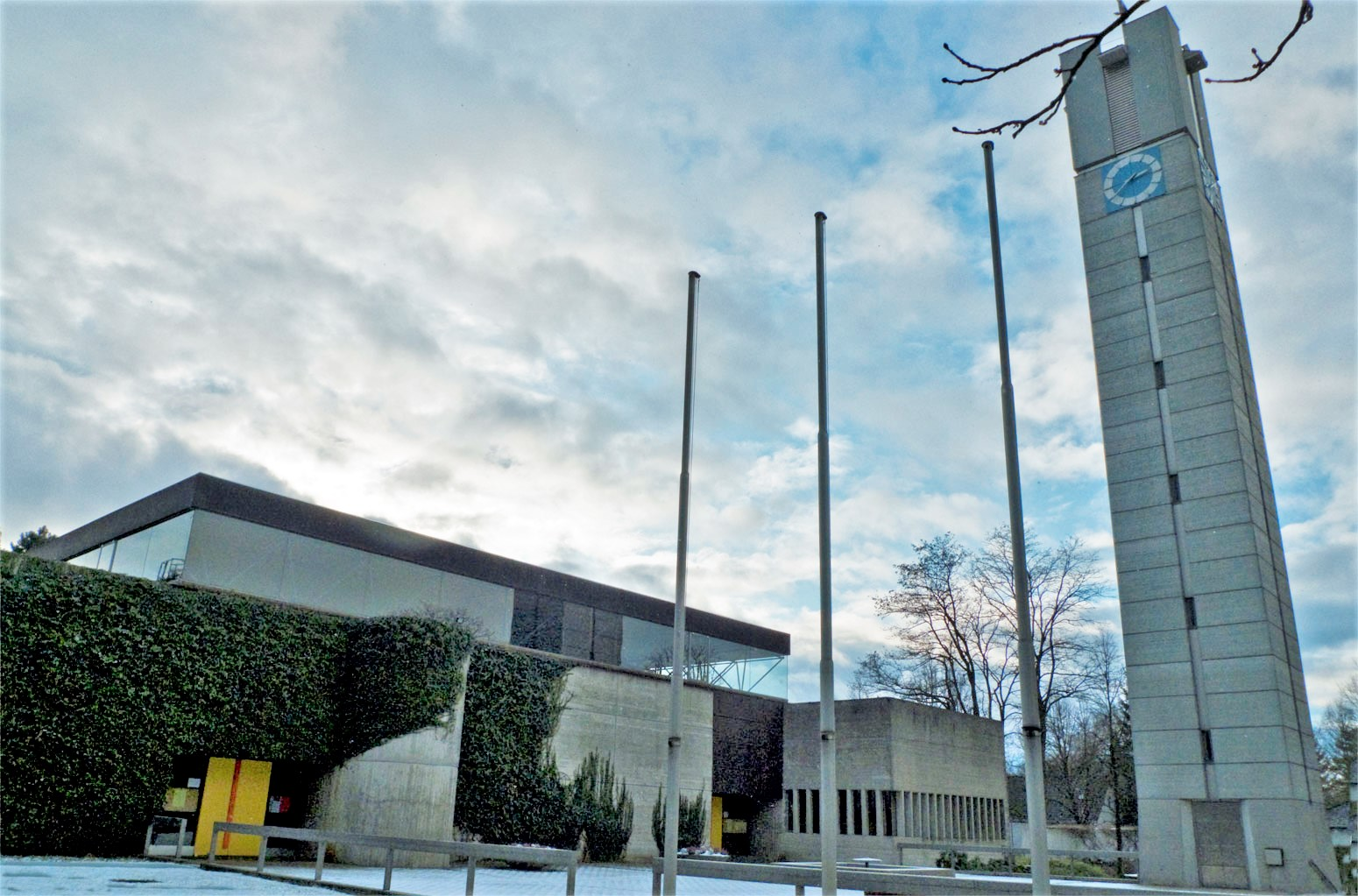
St. Christoph

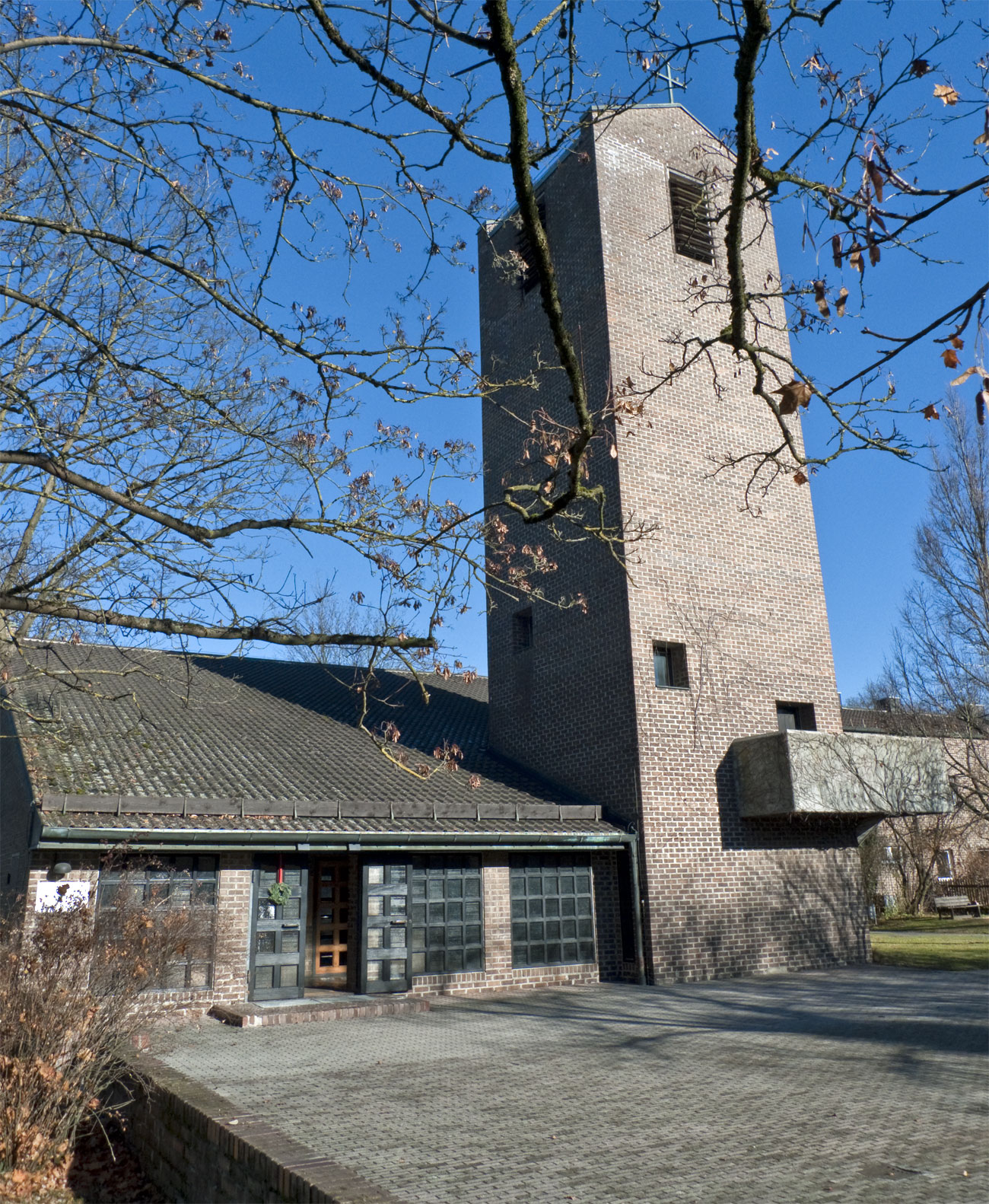
Bethanienkirche

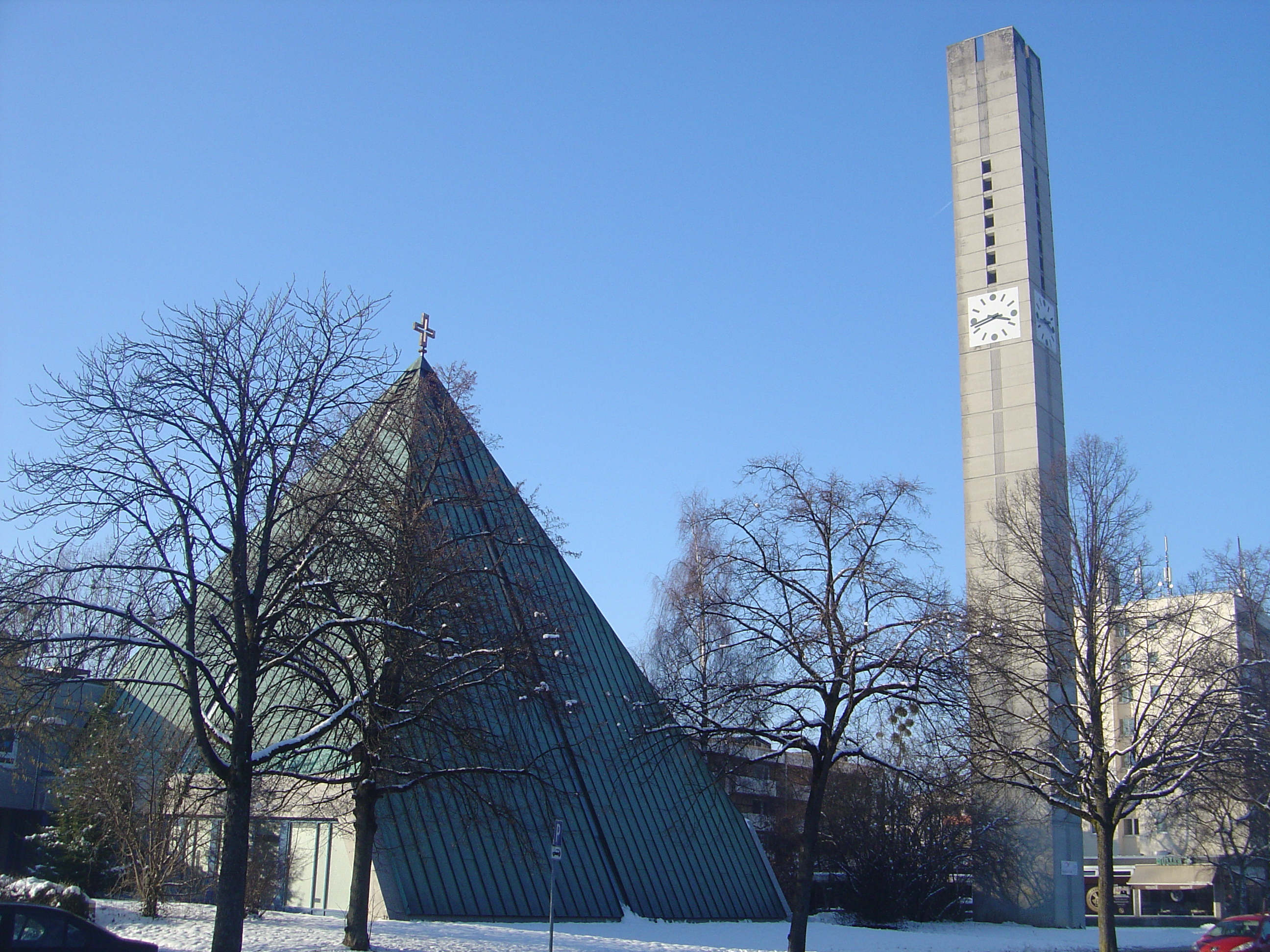
Kapaunerkirche

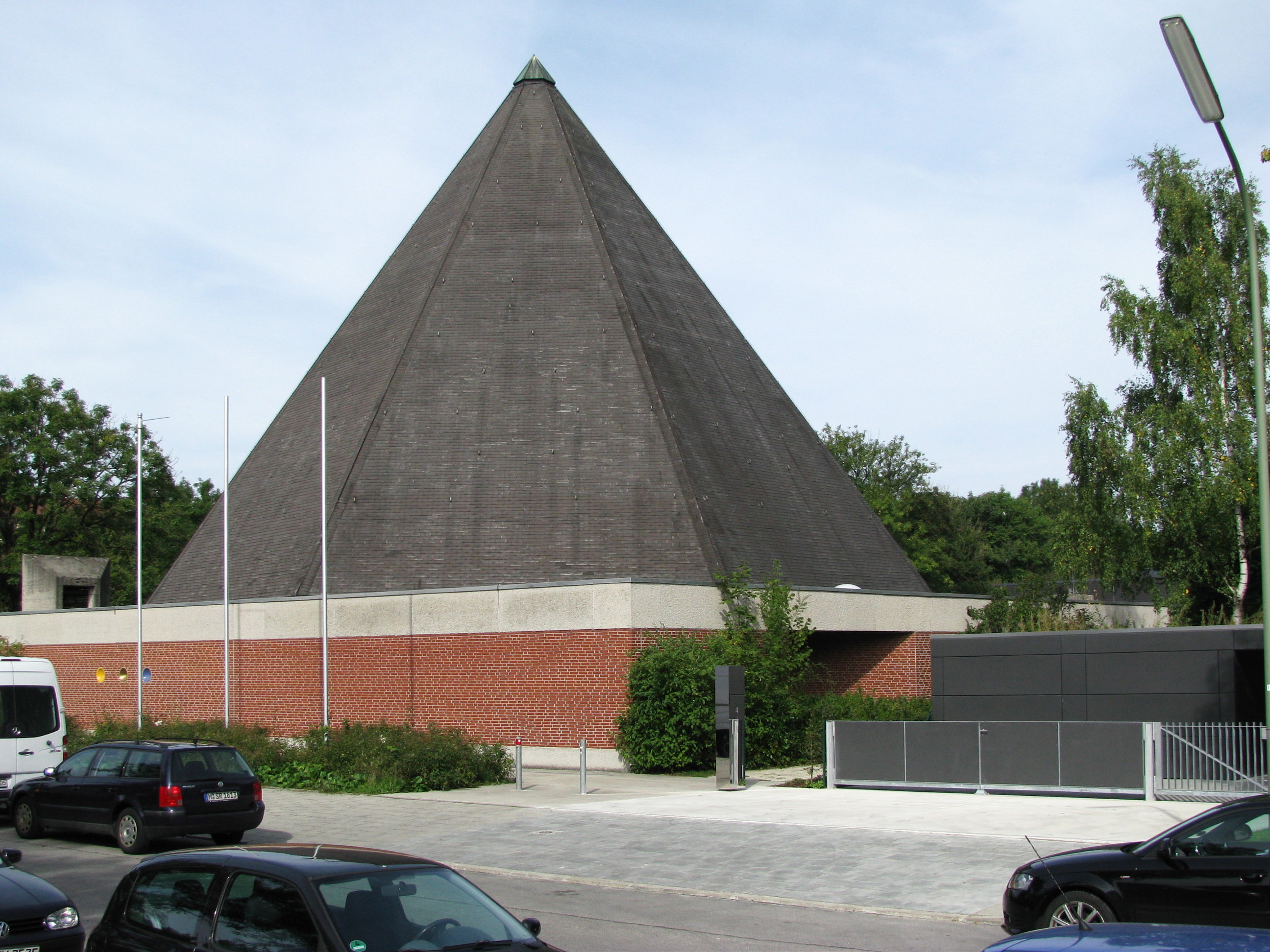
Mariä Sieben Schmerzen

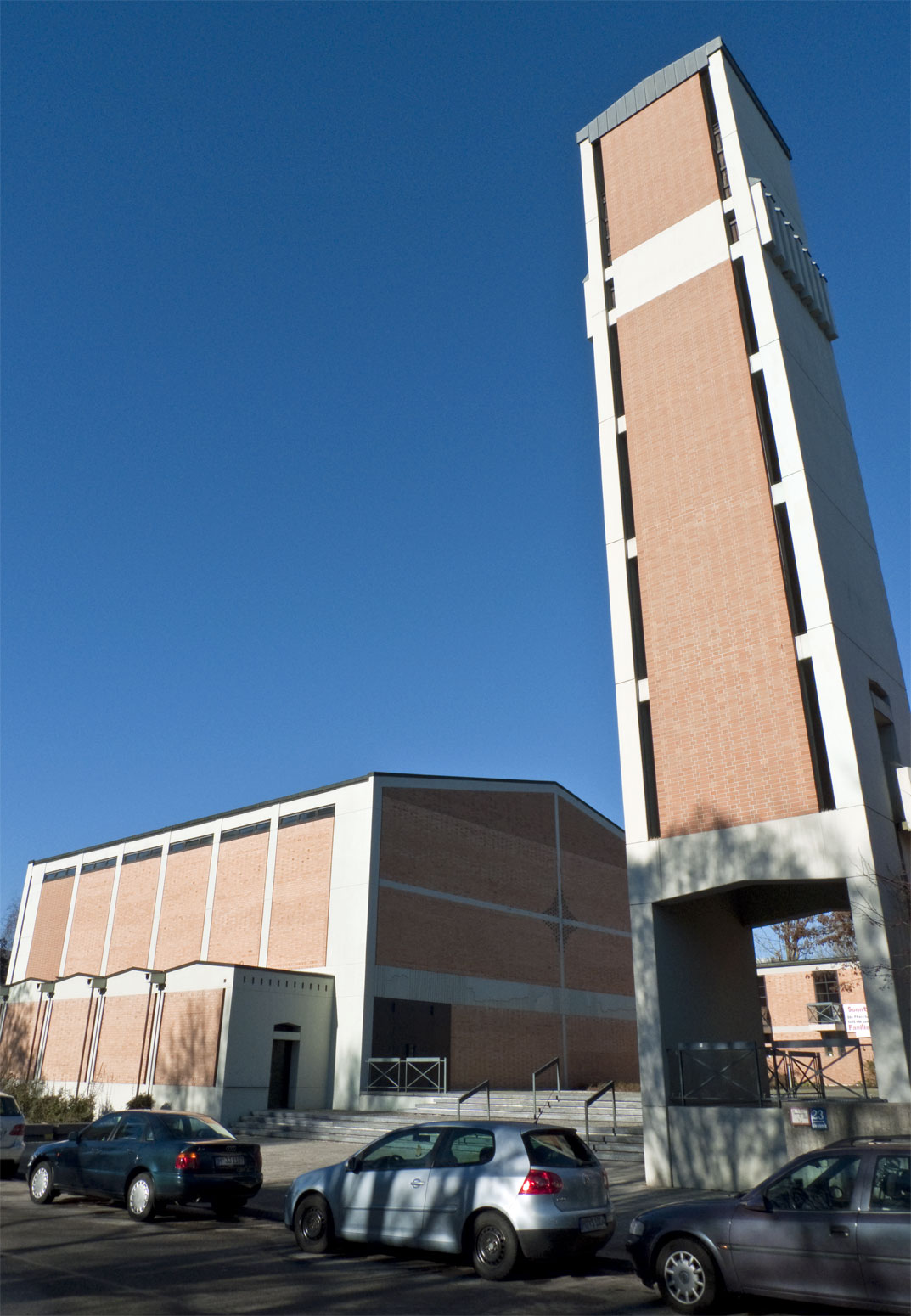
St.Johannes Evangelist

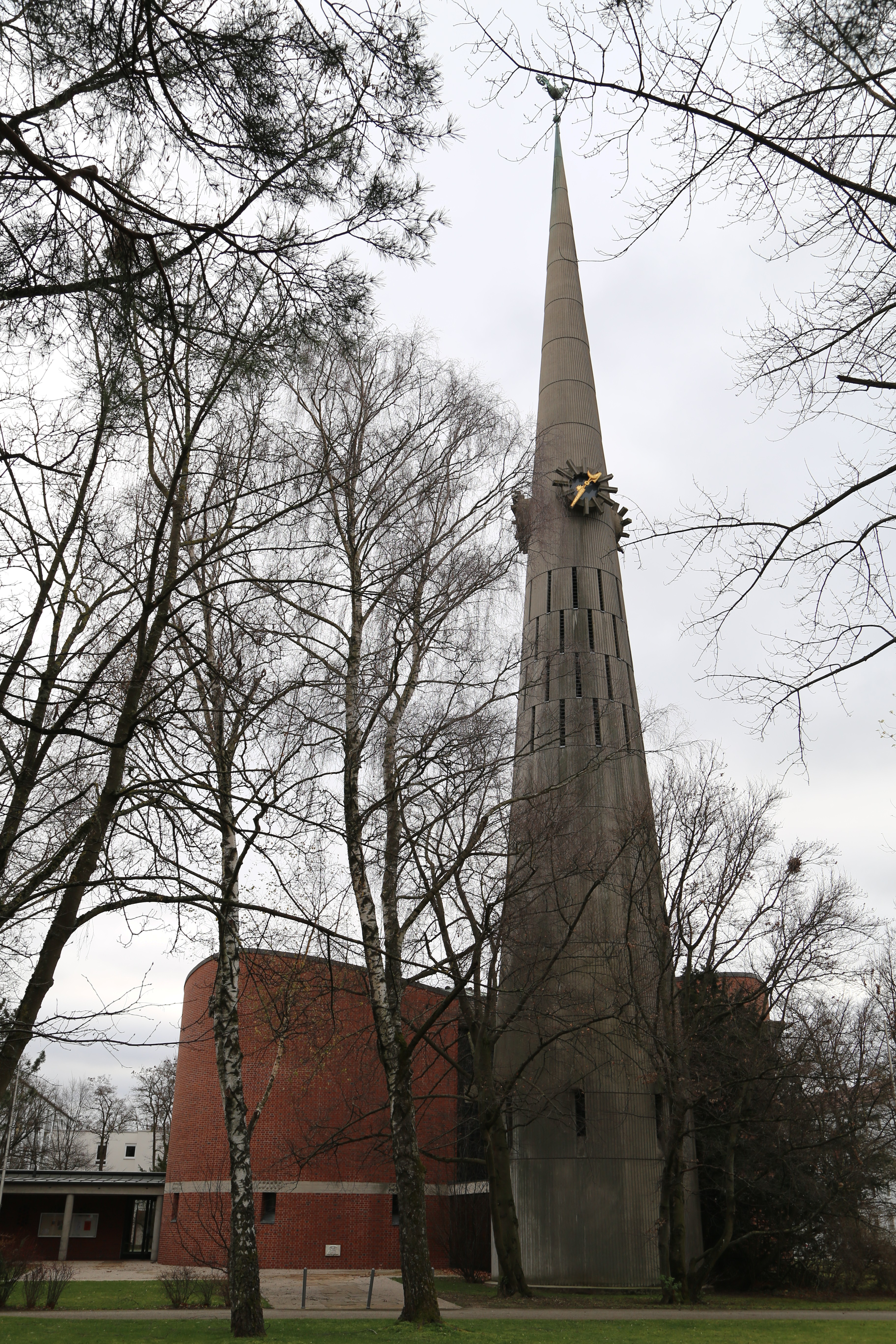
St. Nikolaus

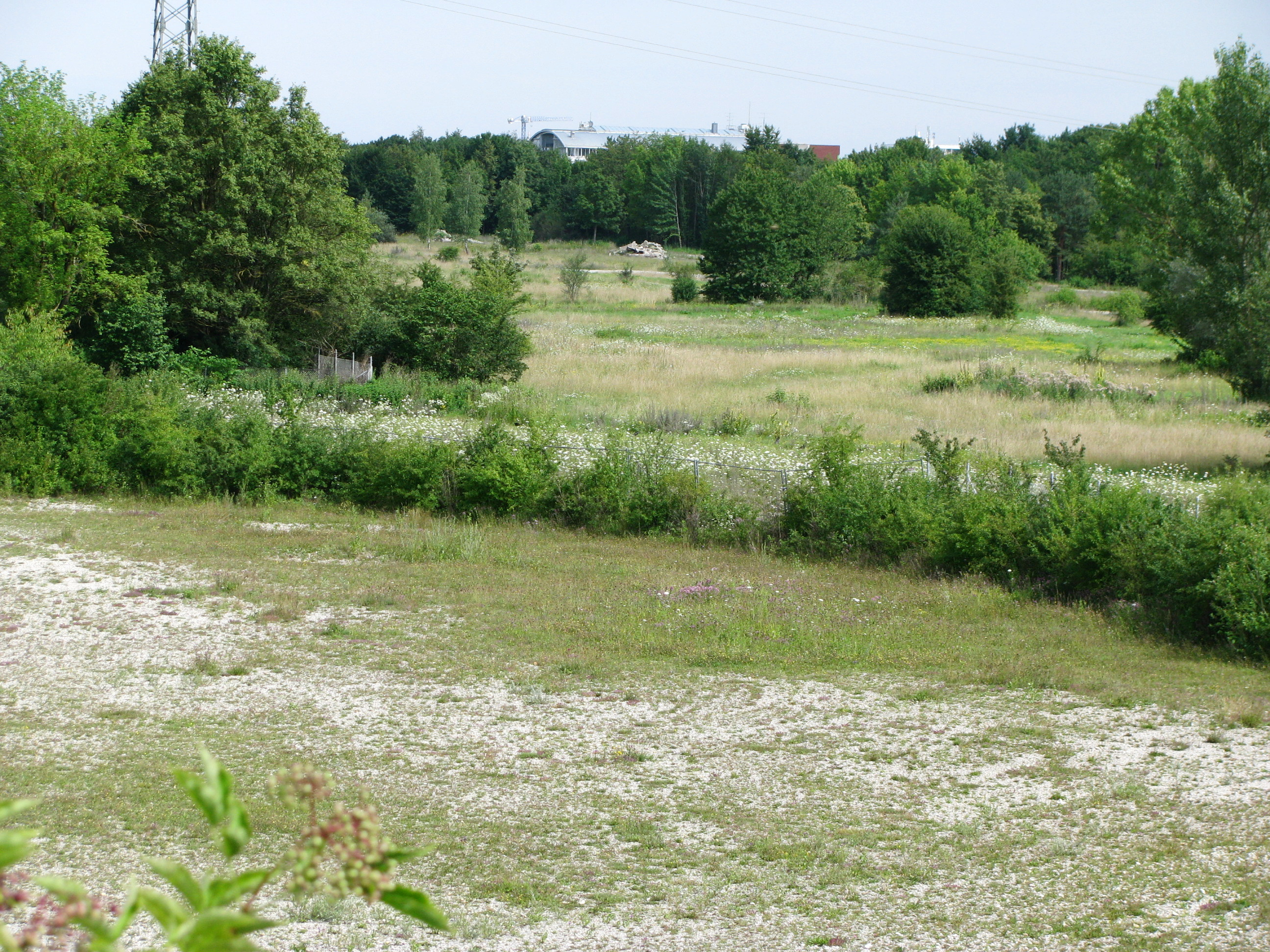
Virginia-Depot

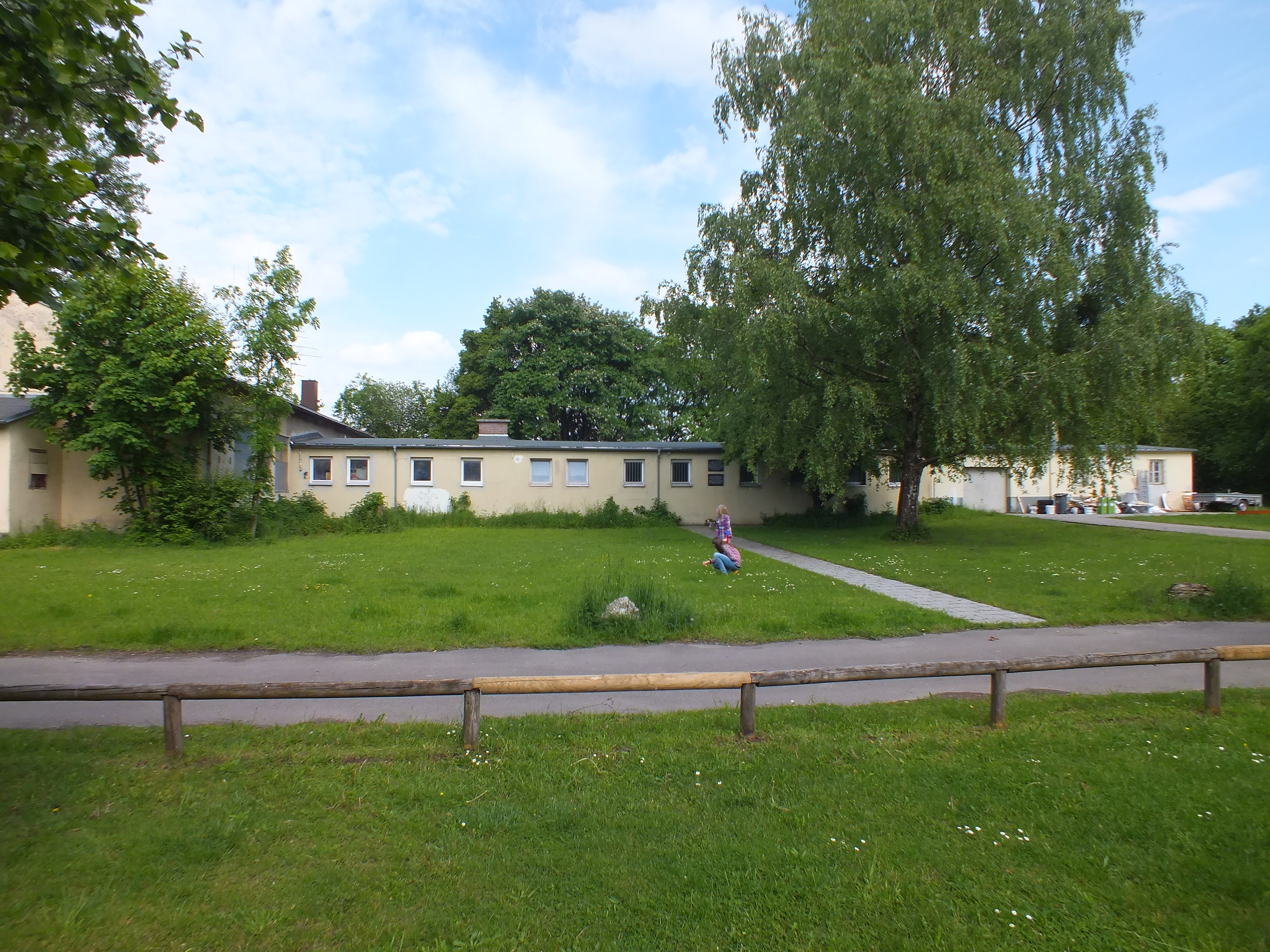
KZ-Außenlager Allach

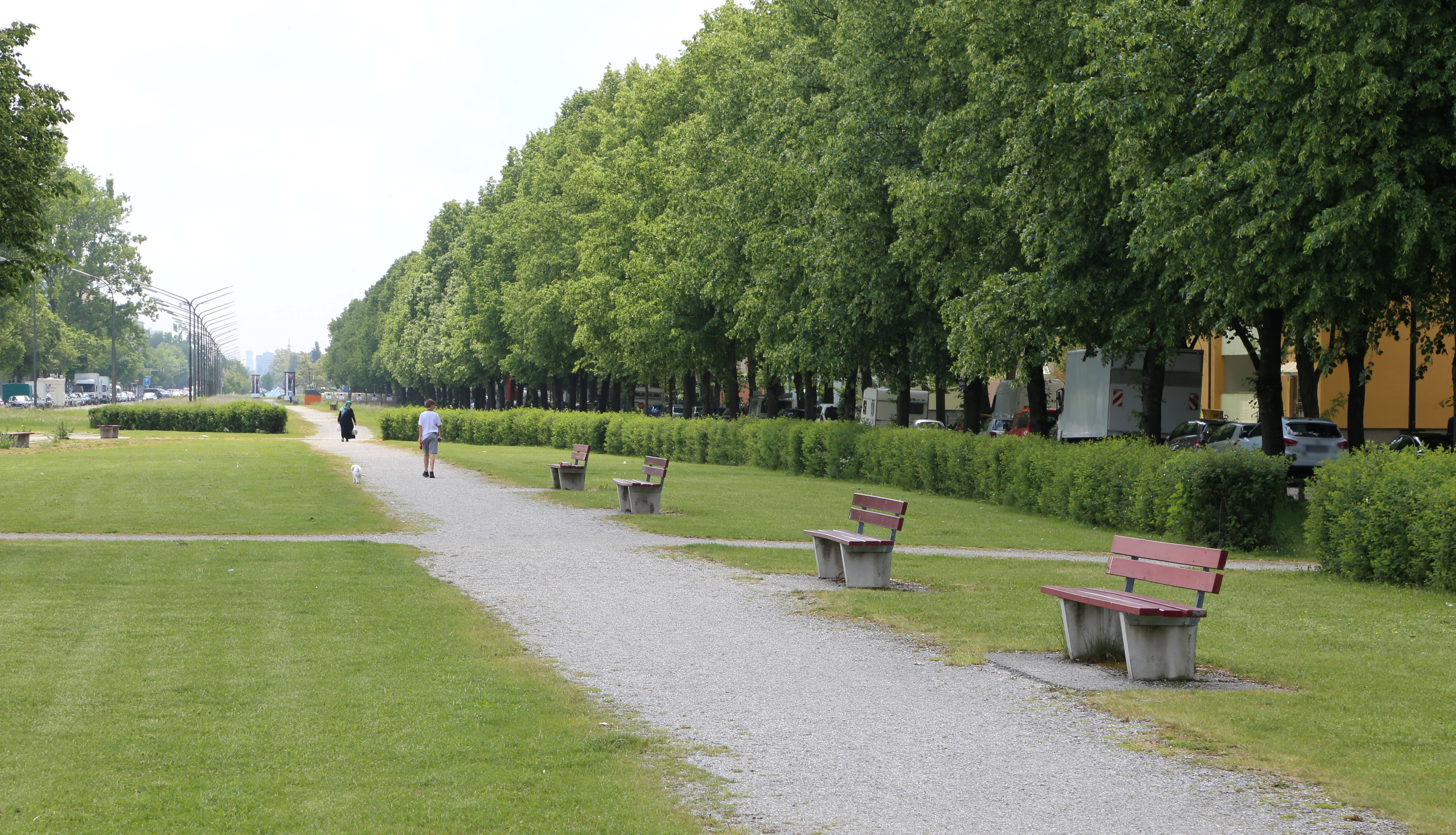
Historical visual axis Schleißheimer Straße

=== 25 – Laim ===
Around the Laimer Anger - a walk through the old town centre: underground station Laimer Platz, ESV-Gelände (sports club), Mathunistraße, INTERIM, Laimer Schlössl, St. Ulrich Church, school on Fürstenrieder Straße, Linsert grocery store, Fürstenrieder Straße.

"At home in Laim" - a cycle tour to housing estates and workplaces: Munich Laim station, Stadtlohner Straße housing estate, Villenkolonie Schlosspark Laim, Agricolaplatz, stoneware factory, HEIMAG housing estate, Neufriedenheim housing estate, building craftsmen's housing estate, railway workers' housing estate, Alte Heimat, Straubinger Straße, Landsberger Straße.

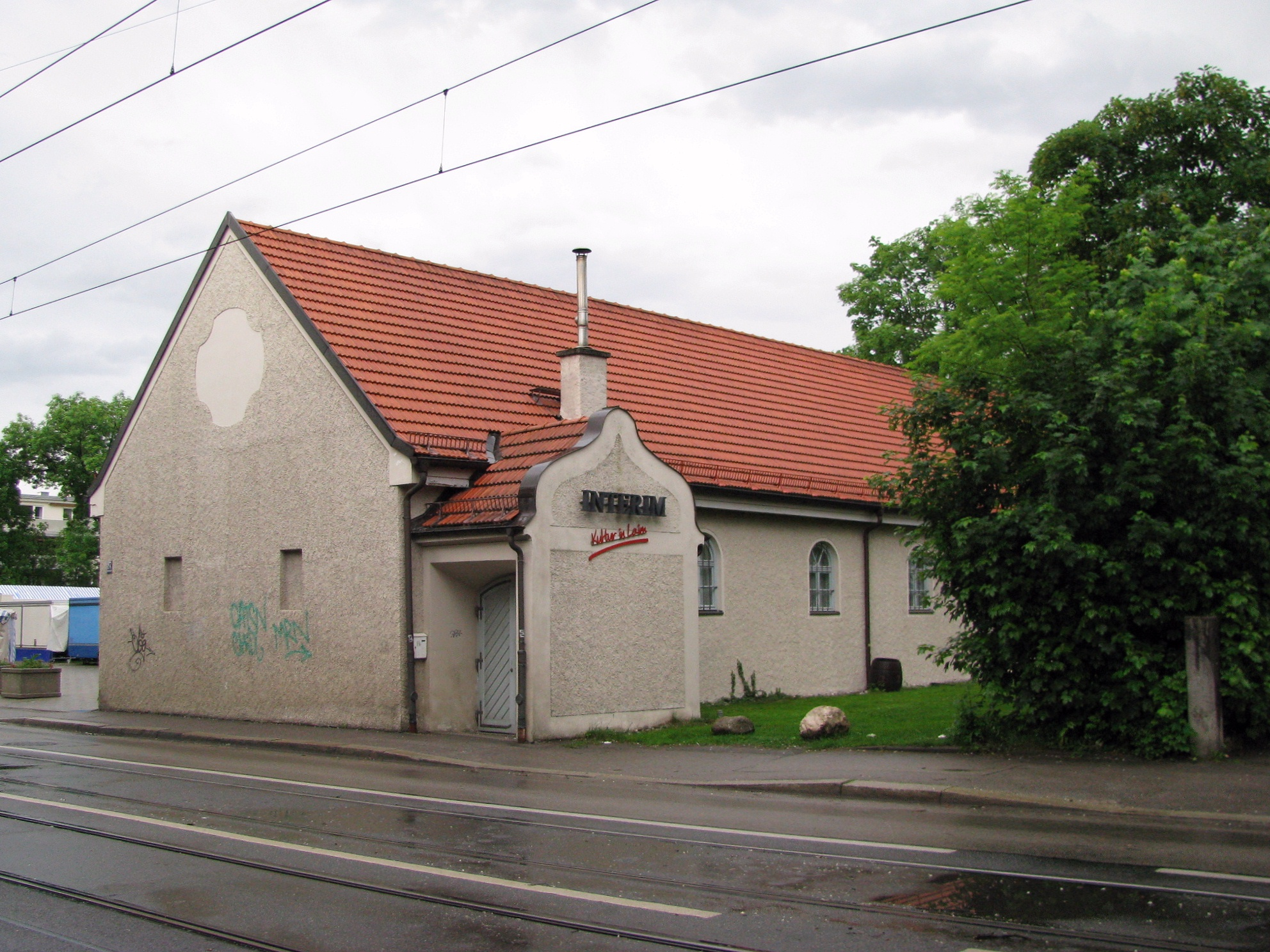
INTERIM-Theater

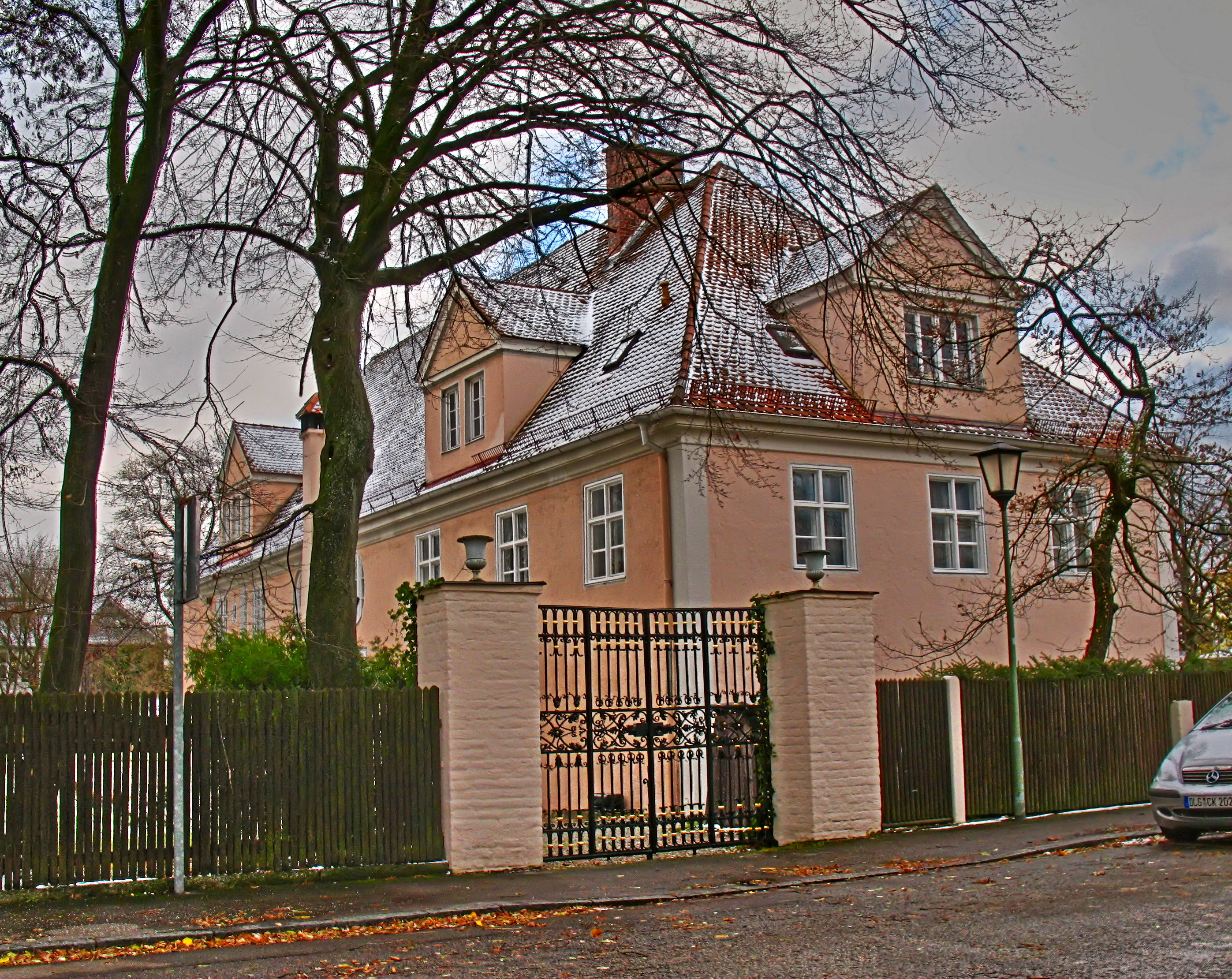
Laimer Schlössl

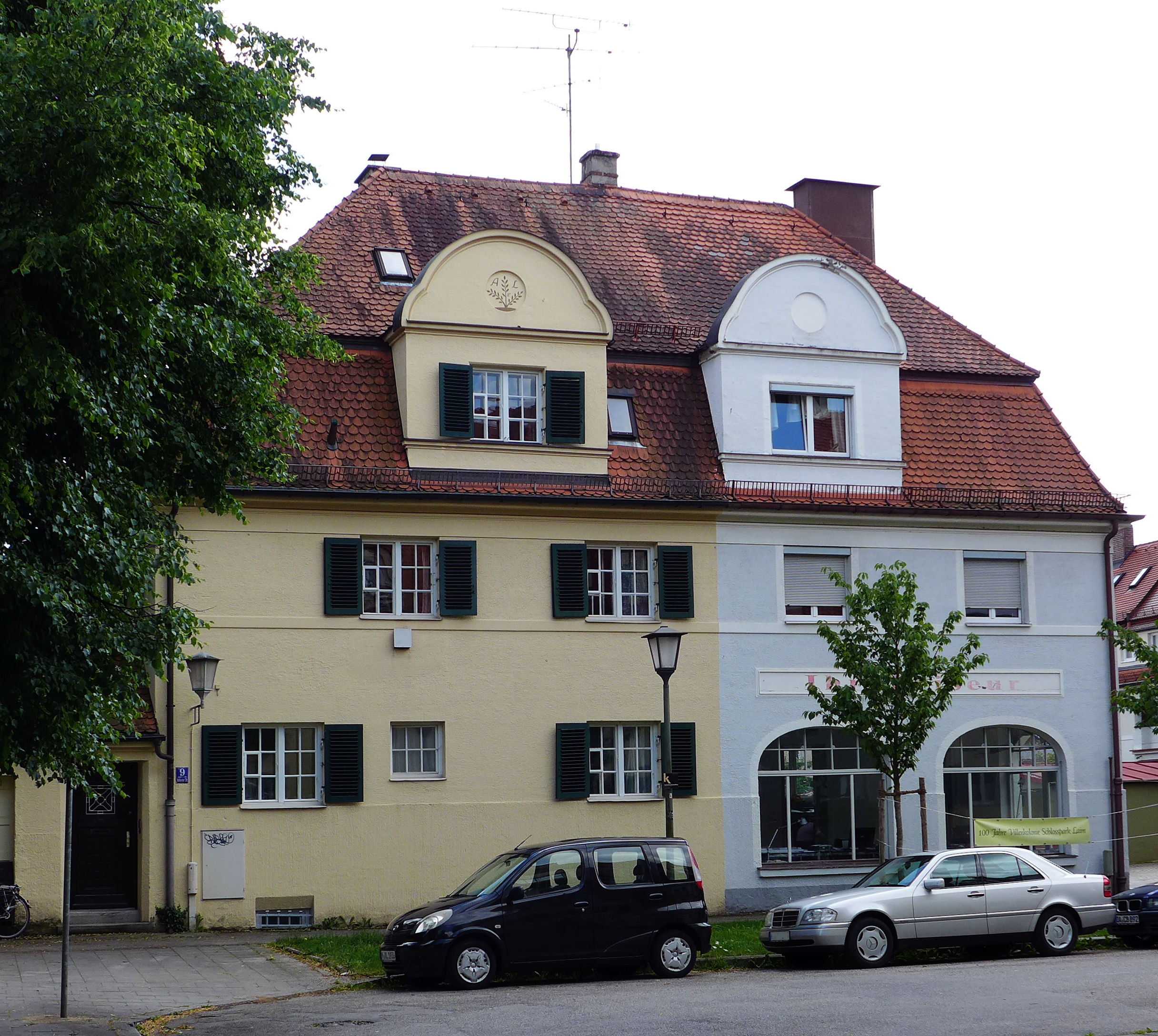
Villenkolonie Schlosspark Laim

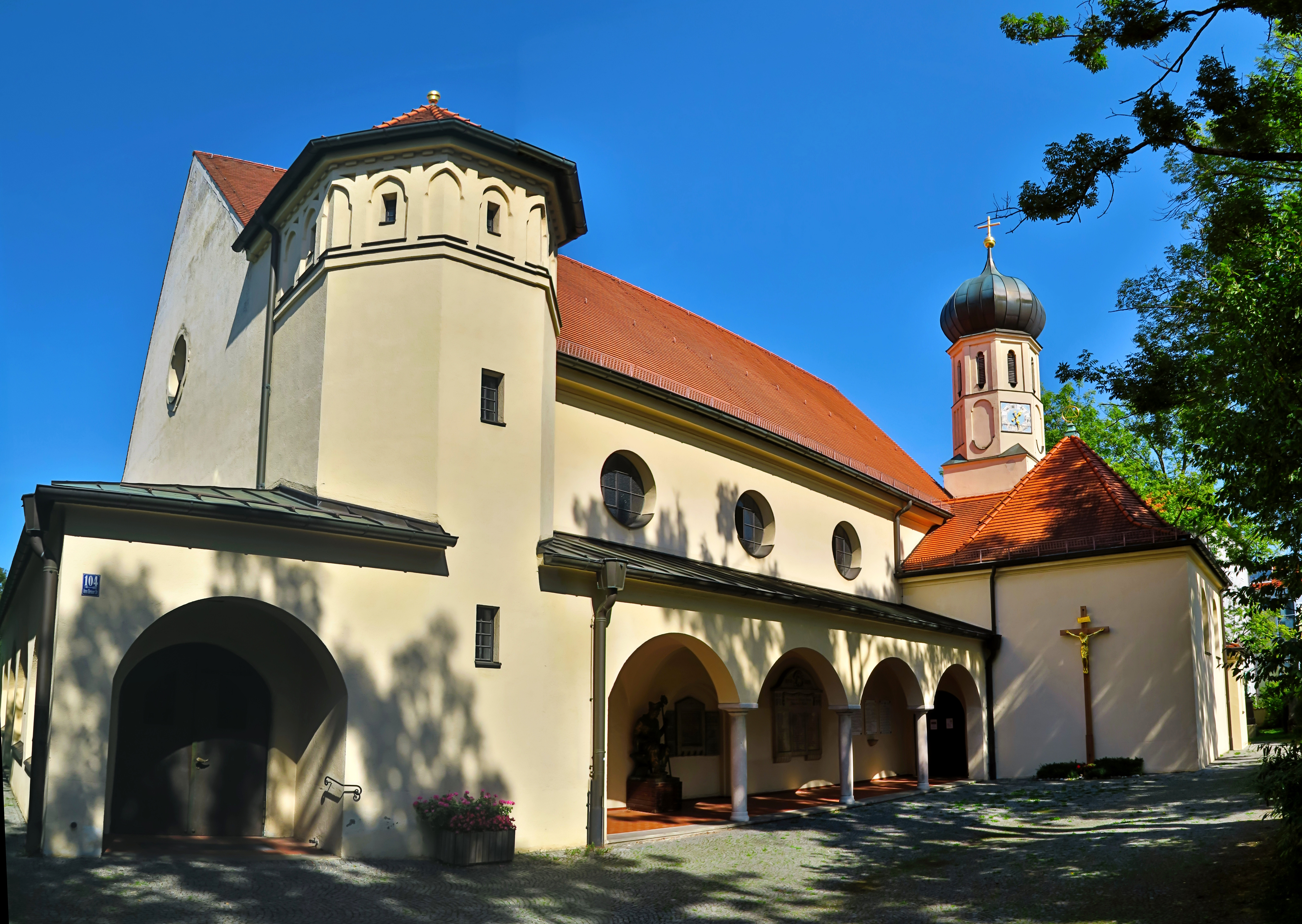
St. Ulrich

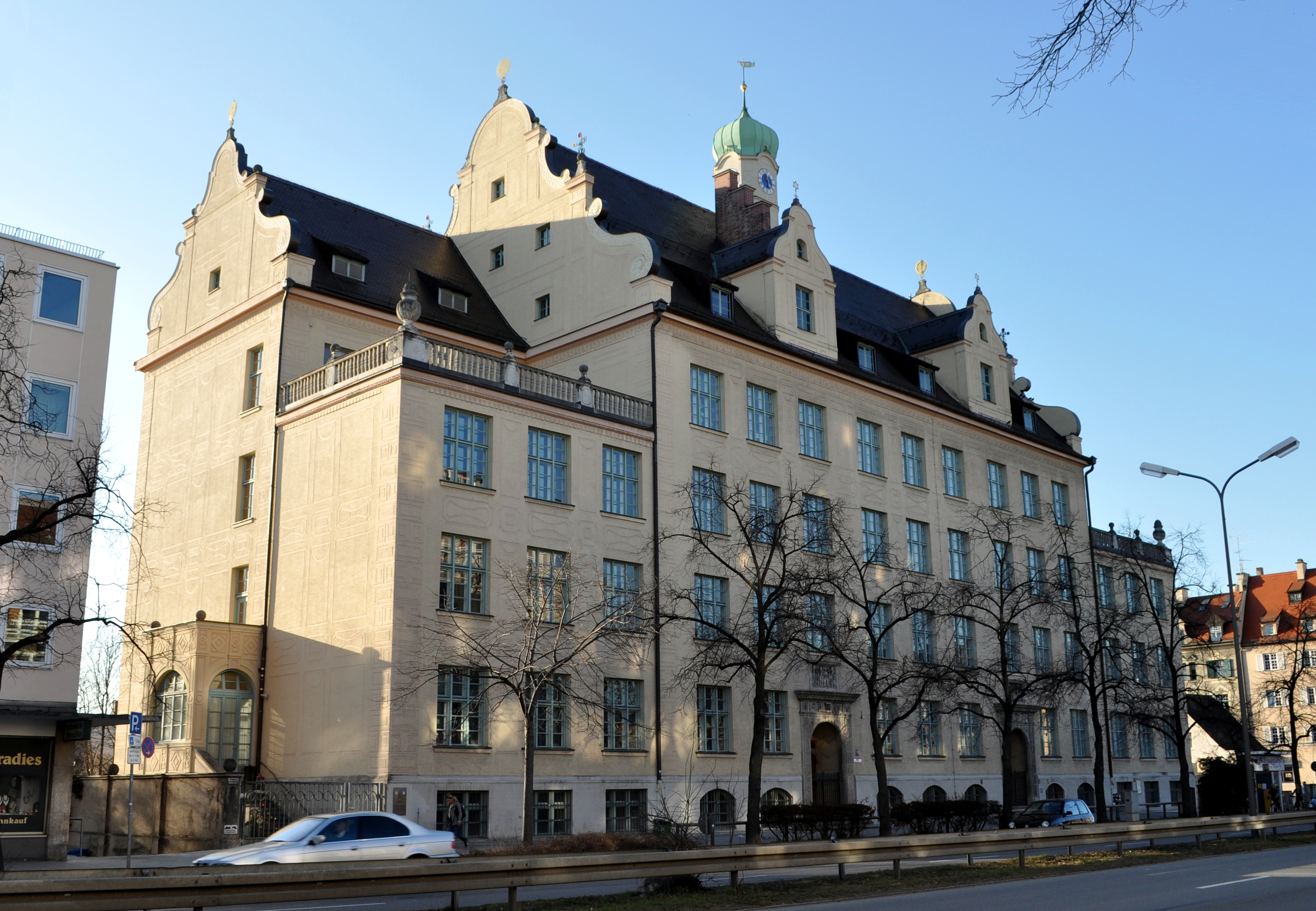
School on Fürstenrieder Straße

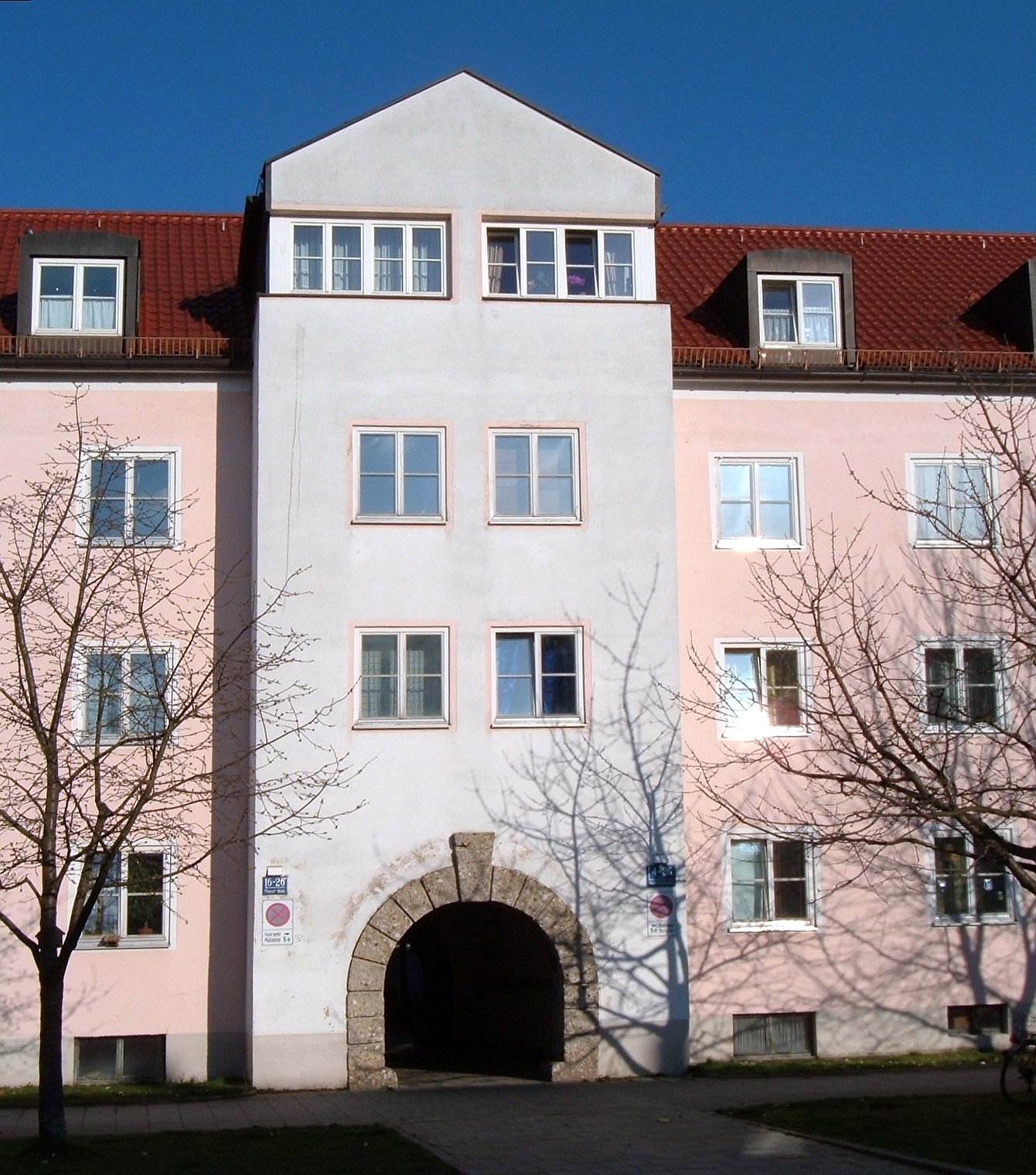
Neufriedenheim
