= Leonrodplatz =

Public square in Munich, Germany

Coordinates: 48.1595°N 11.5468°E

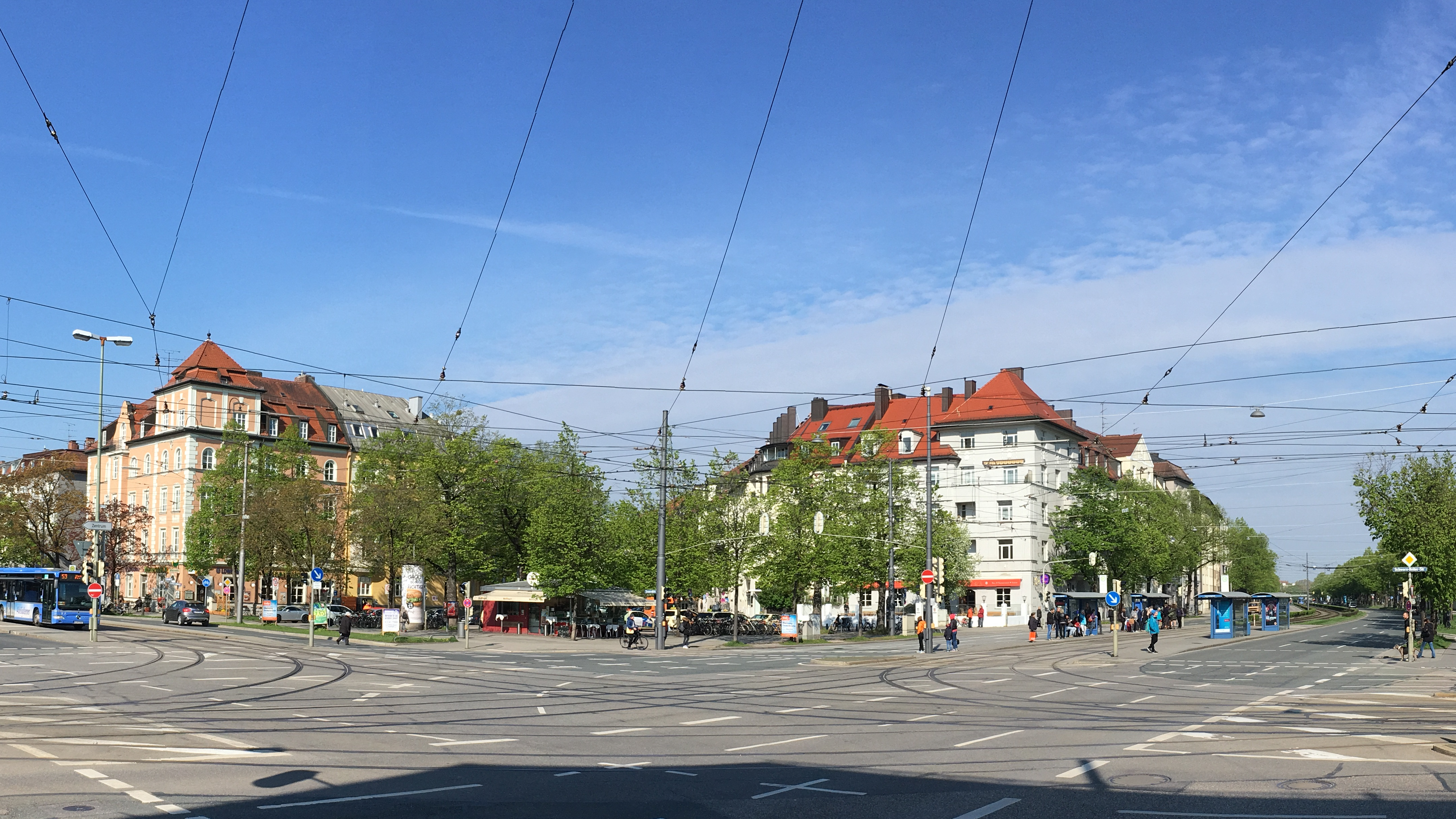
Leonrodplatz (seen from the corner of Dachauer Straße and Schwere-Reiter-Straße)

Leonrodplatz is a square in the Munich district of Neuhausen. It was named in 1927 after the former Bavarian Minister of Justice Leopold von Leonrod.

== Description ==
Leonrodplatz is located at the intersection of Dachauer Straße with Leonrodstraße and Schwere-Reiter-Straße or Dom-Pedro-Straße. The Olympiapark adjoins to the north-east.

To the west, Leonrodplatz is closed around the beginning of Dom-Pedro-Straße and is lined by historically listed buildings from the beginning of the 20th century. To the north, Leonrodplatz will border on the 39,000 square metre, seven-storey building of the Strafjustizzentrum München (Criminal Justice Centre), which has been under construction there since 2016 on a major construction site in which the Free State of Bavaria is investing 300 million EUR and is scheduled to be occupied by 2021. By 2025, the cost had risen to 400 million EUR

To the east, the Pathos Transport Theater has been located since 1982, as well as the Schwere-Reiter-Theater since 1993 and the Theater Werk München on Leonrodplatz since 2011, with the Munich Center of Community Arts (MUCCA) next door. In the future, the Kreativquartier Schwabing will be created here, according to the Süddeutsche Zeitung "the liveliest and most versatile artist biotope" of Munich. In the south are post-war buildings with retail shops, which were the location for the filming of the Tatort Die Wahrheit in May 2016.

The tram lines from Hohenzollernplatz to Rotkreuzplatz and from Stiglmaierplatz to Westfriedhof and on to Moosach cross at Leonrodplatz.

In March 2017, the Neuhausen-Nymphenburg district committee decided to use a design competition to convert Leonrodplatz into a district centre. The planned construction of a mosque for 800 praying people with a 20-metre high dome and 30-metre high minaret on Leonrodplatz, will not be realized, Imam Benjamin Idriz and the Munich Forum for Islam (MFI) had stood behind it.

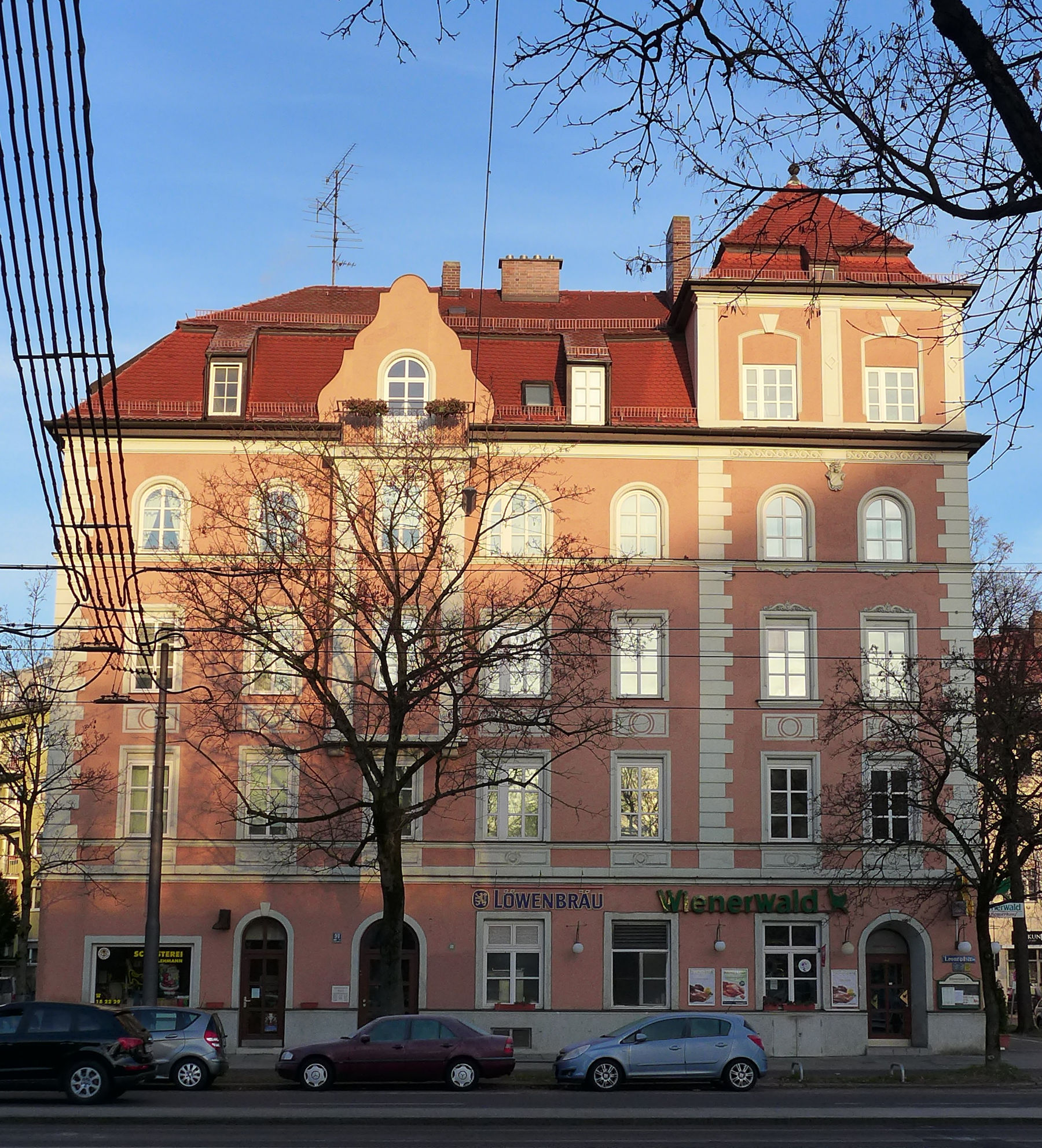
German Renaissance corner building at Leonrodplatz (Leonrodstraße 91) built in 1908 by R. Barbist

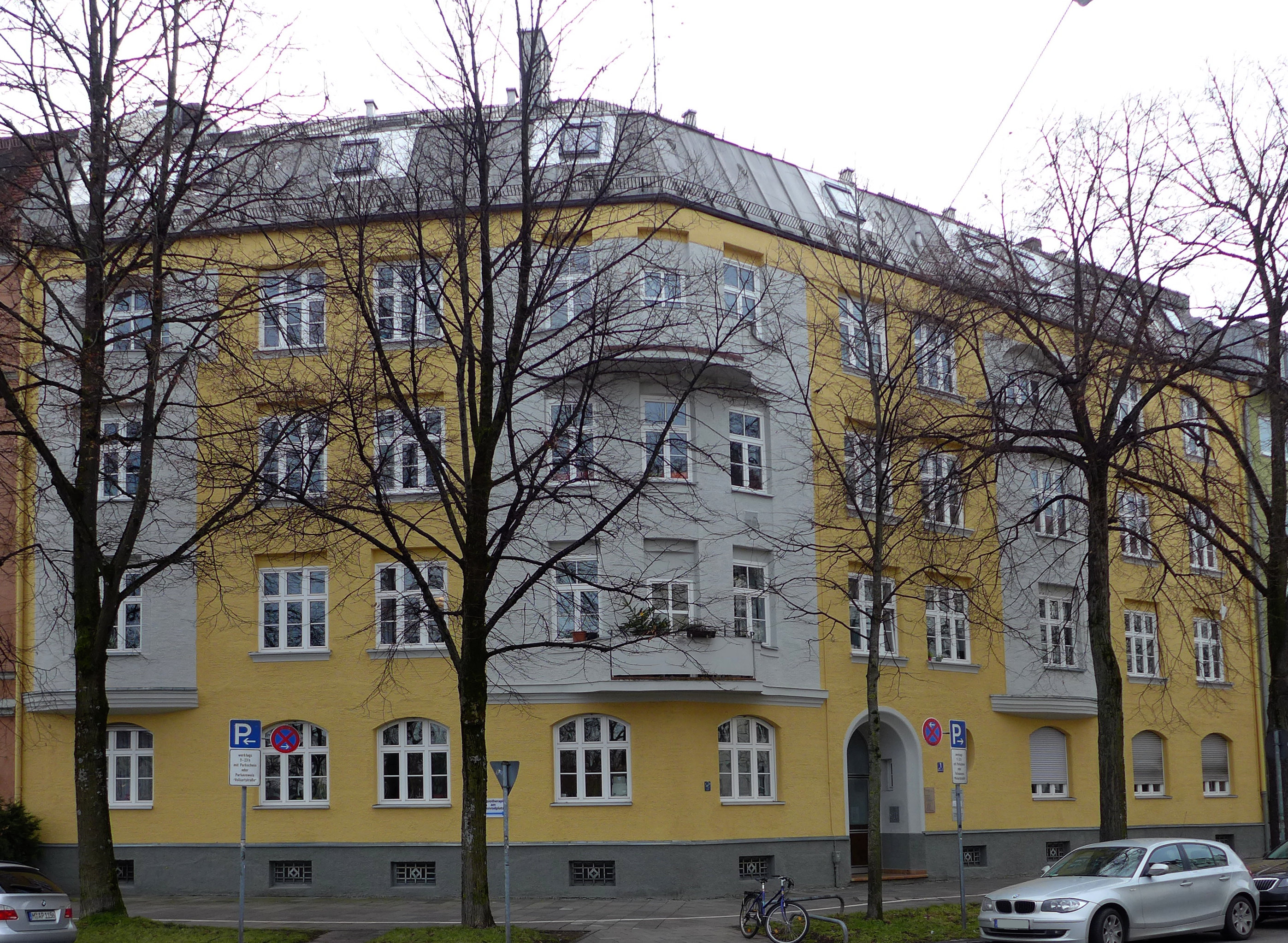
Art nouveau corner building from the beginning of the 20th century at Leonrodplatz (Dom-Pedro-Straße 1)

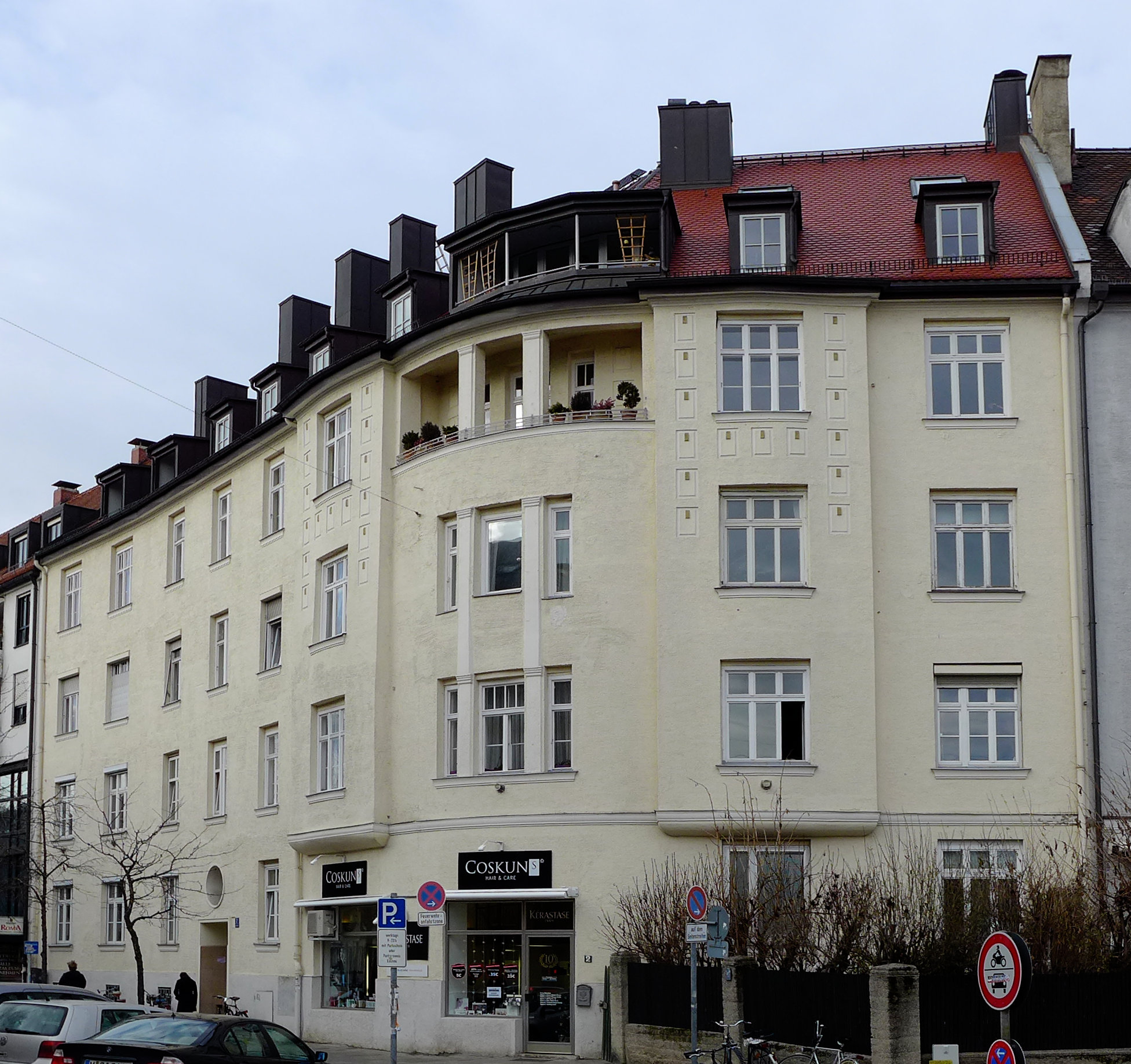
Rounded art nouveau corner building from the beginning of the 20th century at Leonrodplatz (Dom-Pedro-Straße 2)

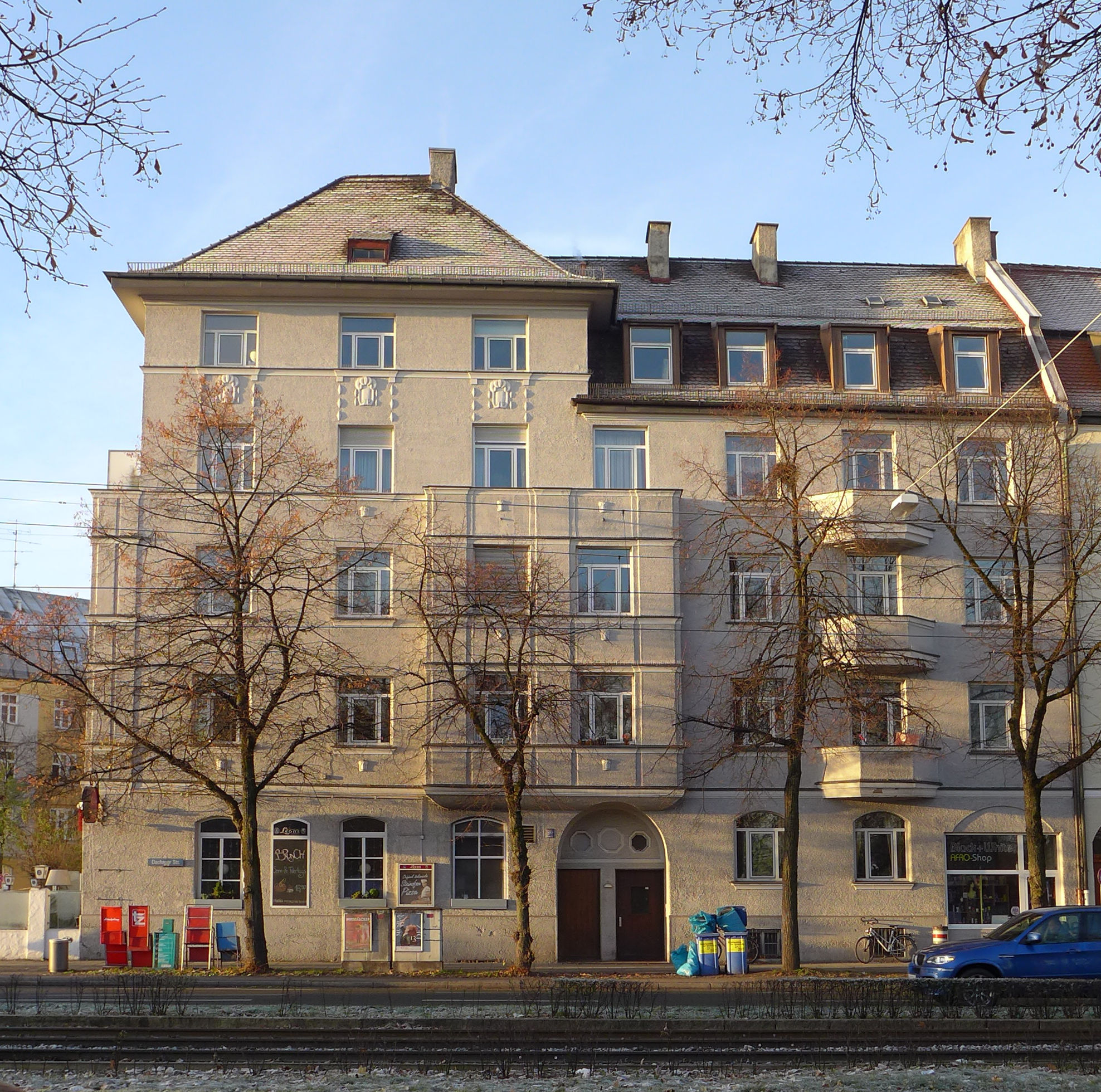
Historical corner building from the beginning of the 20th century at Leonrodplatz (Dachauer Straße 185)

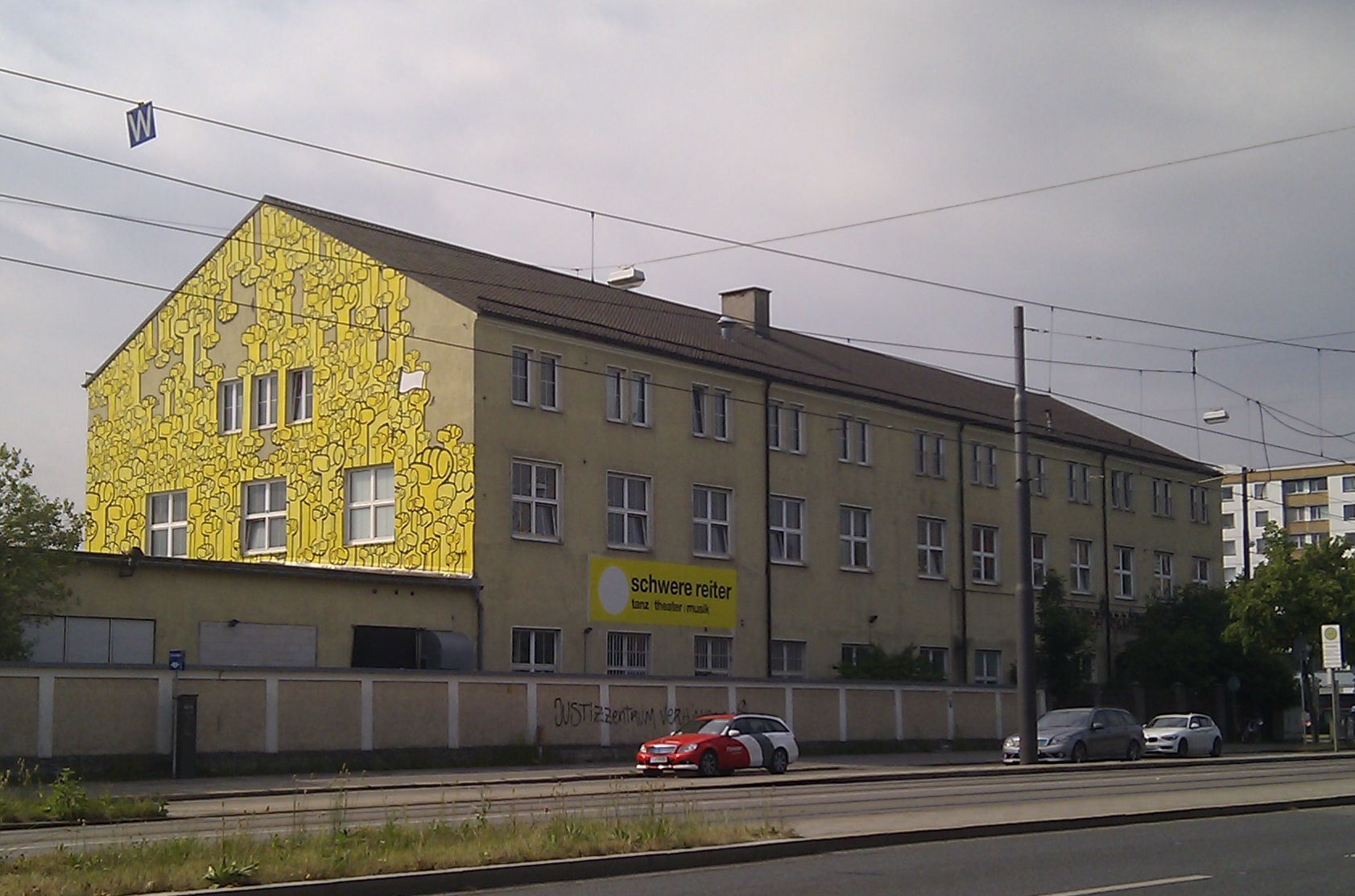
Schwere Reiter Theater at Leonrodplatz

== History ==
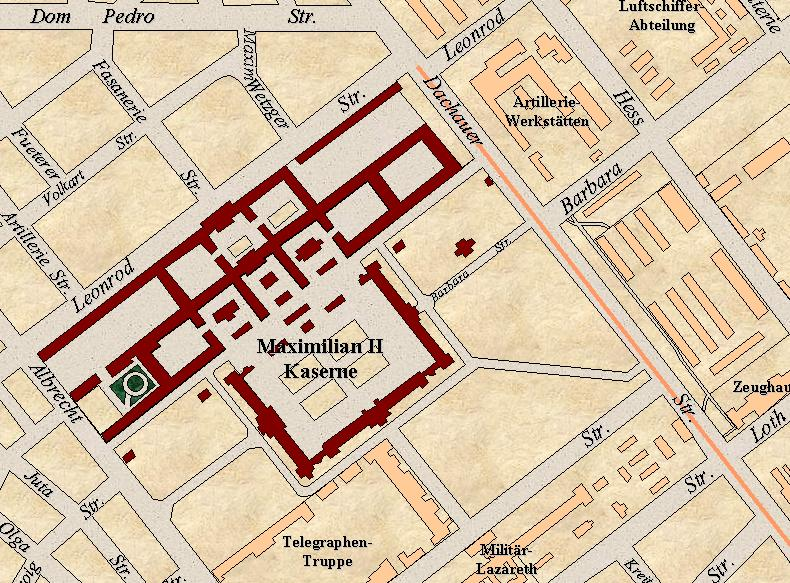
Map section from 1922 with the Maximilian-II-Kaserne and today's Leonrodplatz at the upper edge of the picture.

The area around today's Leonrodplatz was completely undeveloped until the middle of the 19th century. Later, the barracks quarter of Munich developed around Leonrodplatz. As of 1877, South of Leonrodplatz was the Maximilian-II-Kaserne as the largest barracks ever built in Munich, which was destroyed in the Second World War. In 1890 the Eisenbahnkaserne were built north of today's Leonrodplatz, on whose territory the new Criminal Justice Center is now being built. During the construction of the justice centre, a 1,200 square meter underground structure was discovered, which stretched over a length of 80 meters and a width of 15 meters at a depth of up to five meters and was filled with scrap iron after 1945 when the Americans took up quarters. East of Leonrodplatz, since the end of the 19th century, was the artillery workshops, further east the airship barracks (Luitpoldkaserne) were built in 1896 south of today's Schwere-Reiter-Straße and in 1935 the barracks kasern Oberwiesenfeld were added. In 1926, the barrel and Jutierhalle (Jute processing) were built at this corner, the area at the corner of Schwere-Reiter-Straße, Leonrodplatz and Dachauer Straße was used by the Stadtwerke München (public utilities), among others. As the successor of the police driving school, the volunteer fire brigade used a considerable part of the premises from 1995 to May 2016. From 2000 to 2003, the Munich Kammerspiele played in the Jutierhalle on Leonrodplatz.

In 1883, the first Munich steam tram ran from today's Stiglmaierplatz to Nymphenburg, which at the time was located on the outskirts of the city. However, since the trains frightened the horses on Nymphenburger Straße due to the noise, the line was moved to less busy parallel streets. On 25 July 1909, the new tram connection from Stiglmaierplatz to Leonrodplatz was used for the first time. In 1928 the tram lines from Hohenzollernplatz to Rotkreuzplatz followed, and in 1930 the line from Stiglmaierplatz to Moosach station was extended.

For the 1972 Summer Olympics, a car bridge had been built over Leonrodplatz along Dachauer Straße, which was demolished again in the early 1990s.
