= Schwere-Reiter-Straße =

Street in Munich, Germany

Coordinates: 48°09′41″N 11°33′17″E

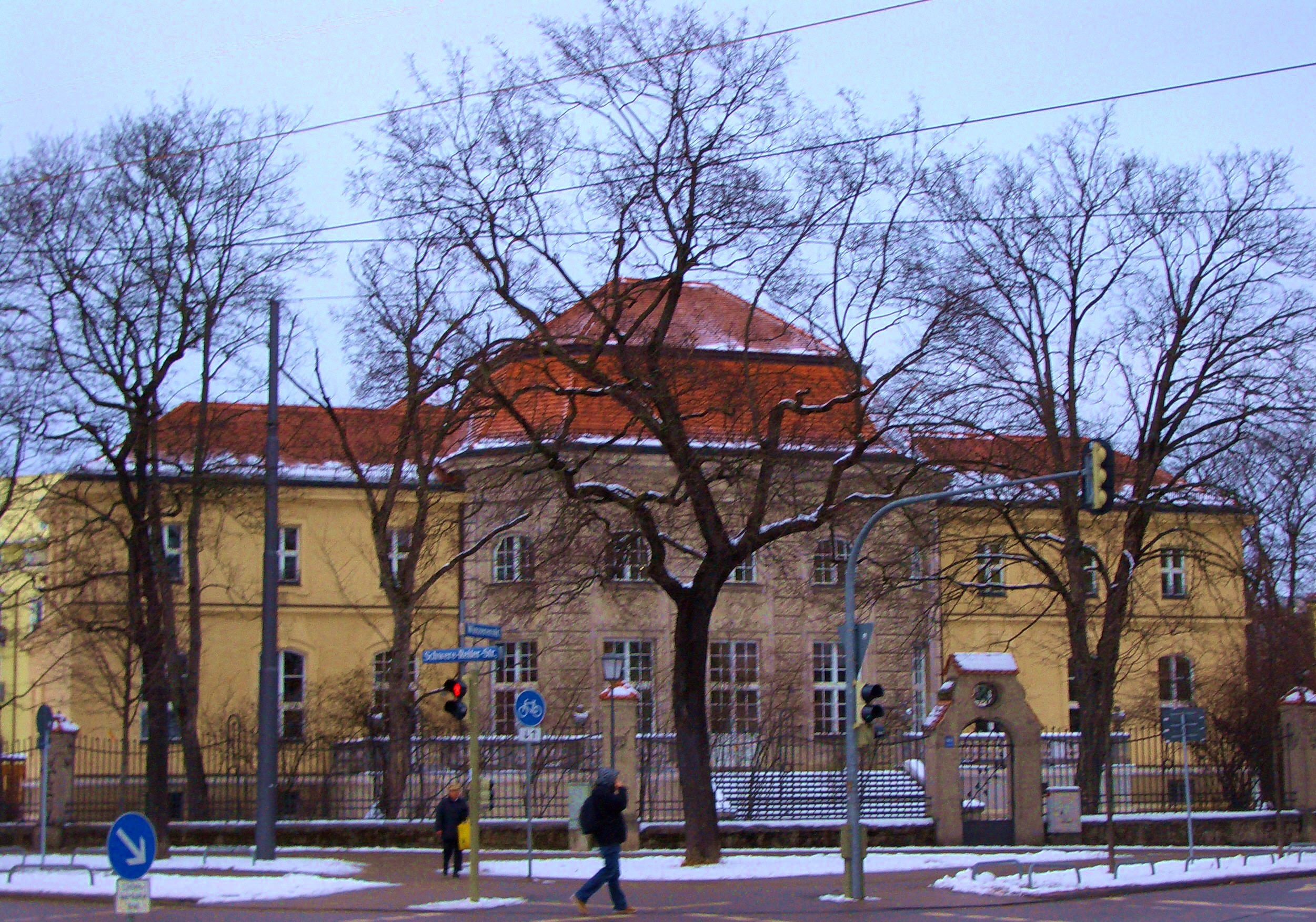
Casino of former Prinz-Leopold-Kaserne

The Schwere-Reiter-Straße is a 1.2 km long street in Munich's Schwabing-West district in the Oberwiesenfeld area. It leads from Leonrodplatz to the Hohenzollernstraße on the corner of Winzererstraße. North is the Olympic Park.

== Buildings ==
On the corner of Dachauer Straße is the cultural center "Schwere Reiter - Dance Theater" since 1993, next to it is the "Munich Center of Community Arts" (MUCCA) and other objects of the creative district Schwabing, according to Süddeutsche Zeitung "the most vibrant and versatile artist biotope" of Munich. In 2021, the criminal justice center in Munich is to move into a seven-storey building, the construction of which began in 2016. Next to Schwerer-Reiter-Straße 9 are the institutes and stables of the Veterinary Faculty of LMU Munich. At Schwerer-Reiter-Straße 15 you will find the theater tent "Das Schloss". On the corner of Ackermannstraße, a boarding house was completed in 2016, which was awarded in 2012 for its design choice from seven designs. At the Schwere-Reiter-Straße 35 is the dormitory Schwere-Reiter- Straße. One of the four locations of the German Patent and Trade Mark Office is located at Schwere-Reiter-Straße 37. In Schwere-Reiter-Straße 39 stands a three-storey, richly structured Neo-Baroque style building with three Risaliten with Mansard walm roofs, built from 1900 to 1902 by Georg Zeiser. In it was formerly the team building of the Prince-Leopold-Kaserne.

In Schwerere-Reiter-Straße 41 stands the former staff building of the Prinz-Leopold-Kaserne, which was also built from 1900 to 1902 by Georg Zeiser as a three-storey articulated Neo-Baroque style building with tent roof and coat of arms relief on the gabel. At the corner of Winzererstraße stands the former casino building of the Prinz-Leopold-Kaserne, a castle-like freestanding, inclined neo-baroque corner building with rich sculptural decor and front terrace with open staircase.

Southeast of the casino building is the city archives Munich. The Barbarasiedlung is bordered to the north by the Schwere-Reiter-Straße. It is a document for the small housing construction in the years before the First World War and stands under the principles of Theodor Fischer with elements of the garden city idea under ensemble protection.

Over its entire length, the Schwere-Reiter-Straße has two lanes in each direction, which are divided in the middle by the tracks of the tram line 12. As a special feature, the section between Winzererstraße and Ackermannstraße has an additional separation in the lanes though a green strip with densely standing old trees. The use is permitted for motorized traffic, however, only in the east-west direction. As a result, the Schwere-Reiter-Straße has a width of over 50 m in this area.

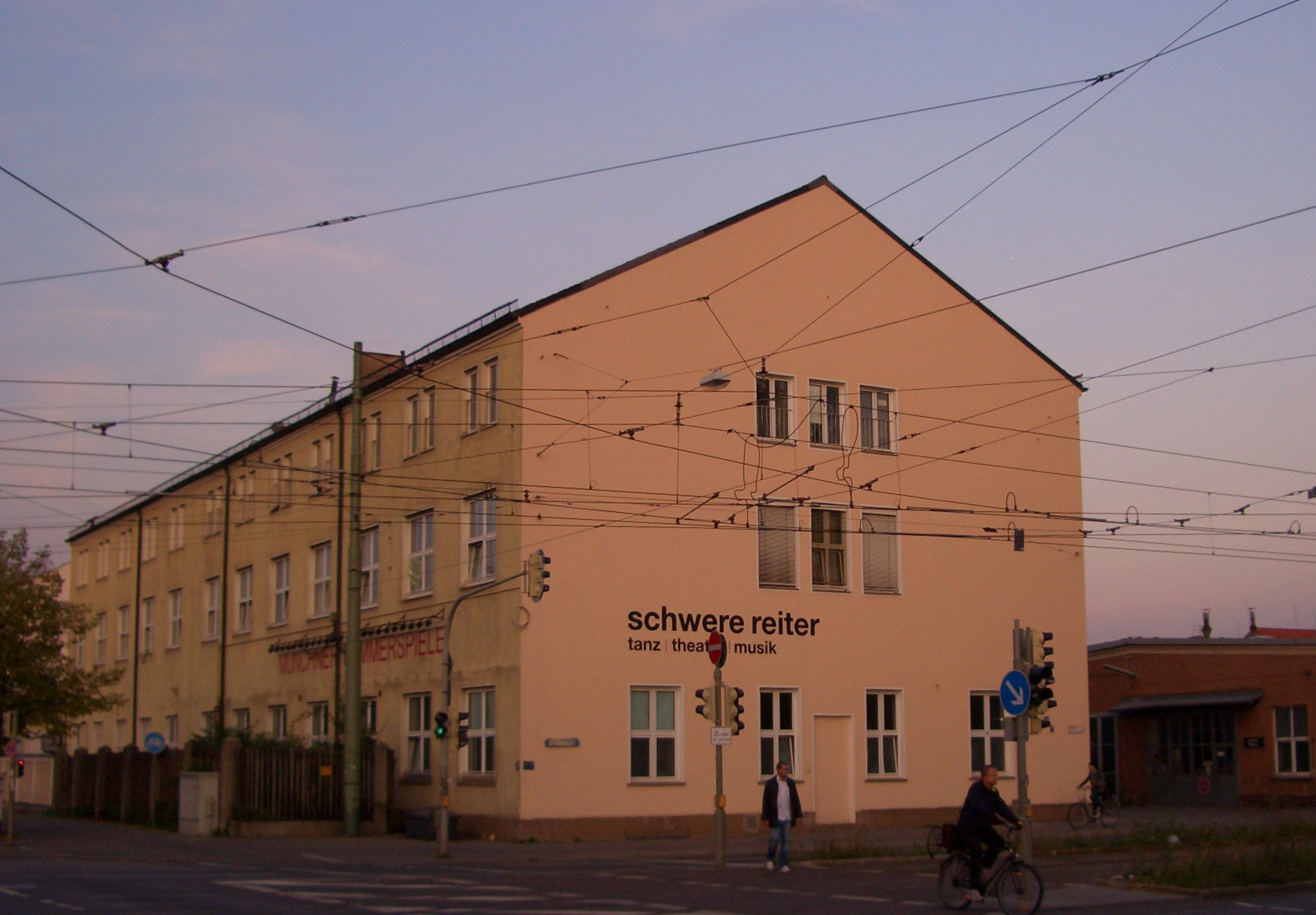
Schwere Reiter - dance theater in the former artillery workshops

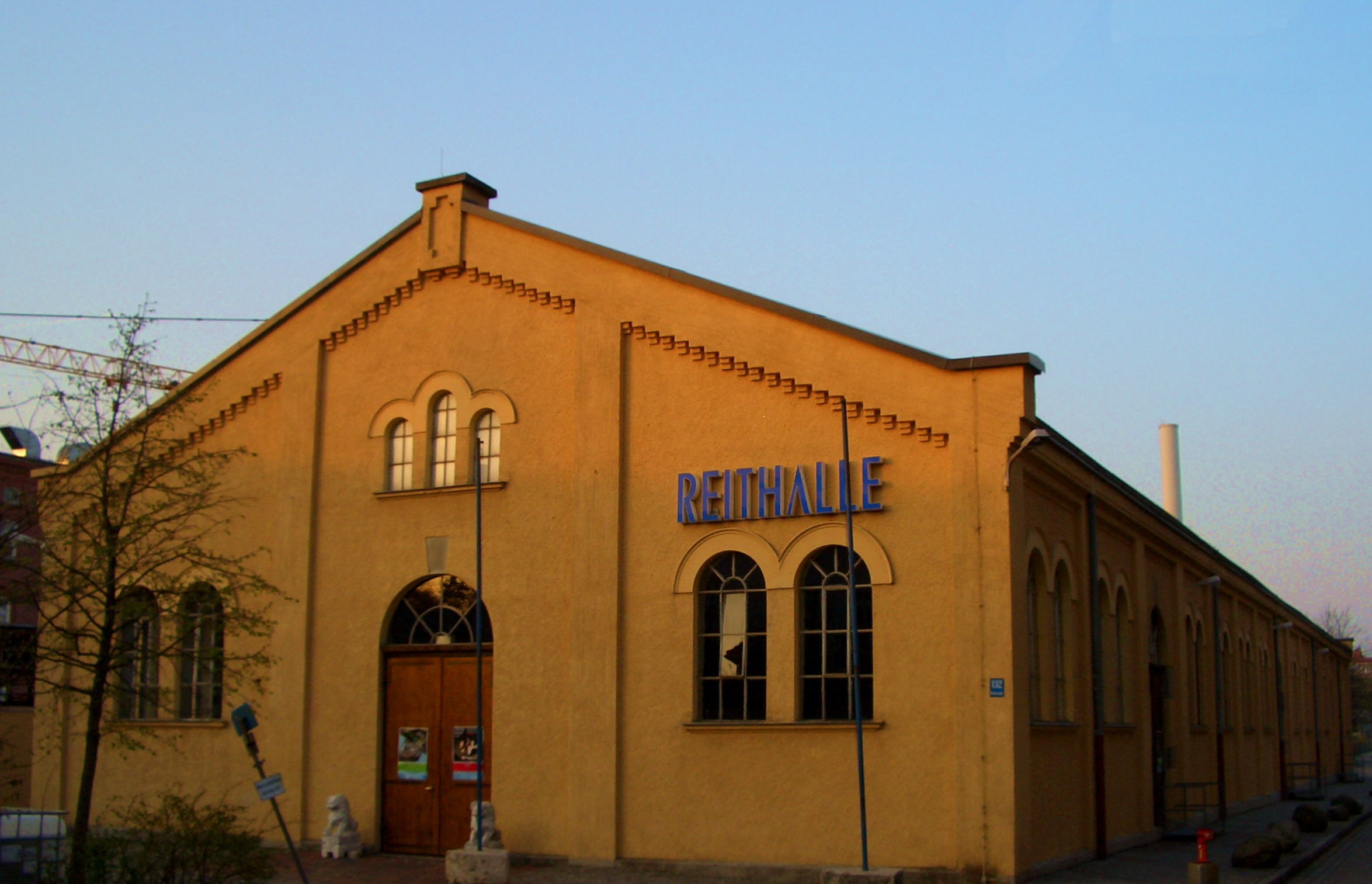
Former drill parade hall of the 2nd Bavarian Infantry Regiment "Kronprinz"

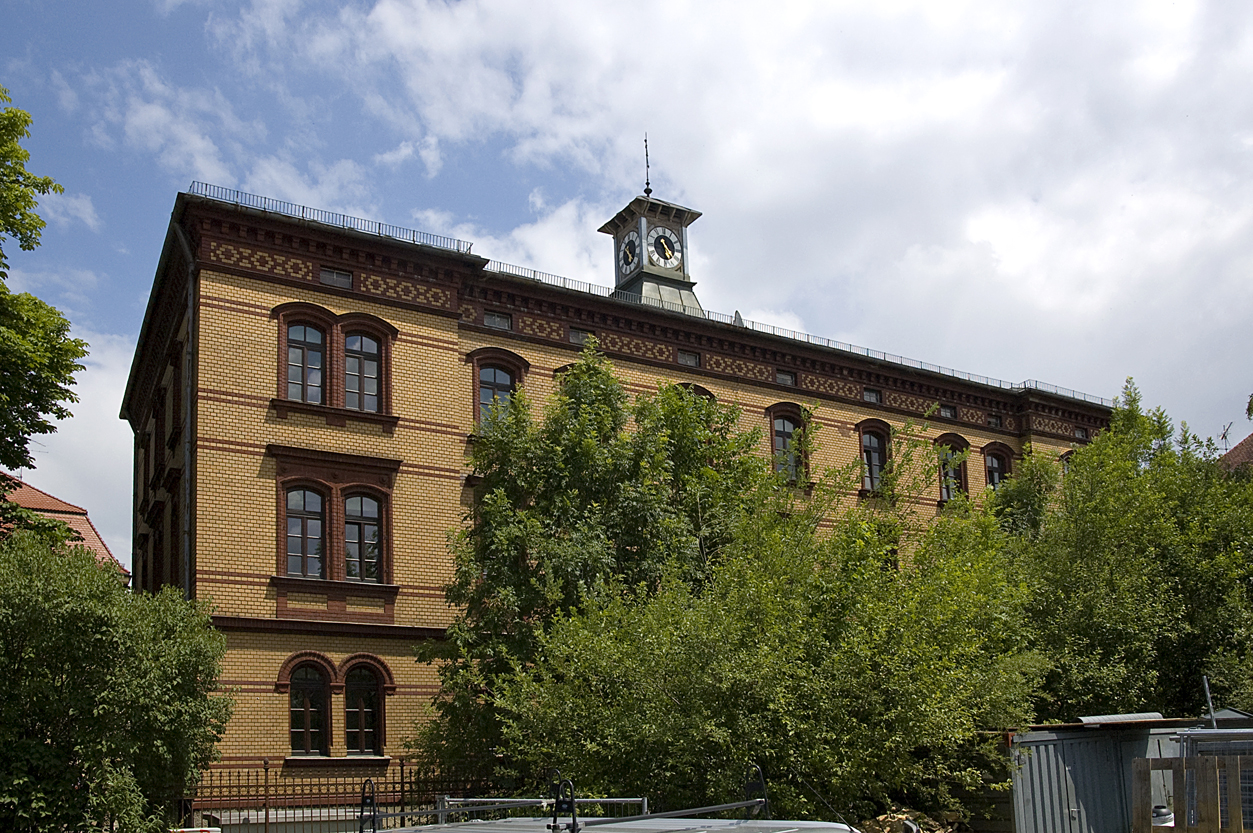
Former airship barracks of the Luitpoldkaserne in the Schwere-Reiter-Straße 4

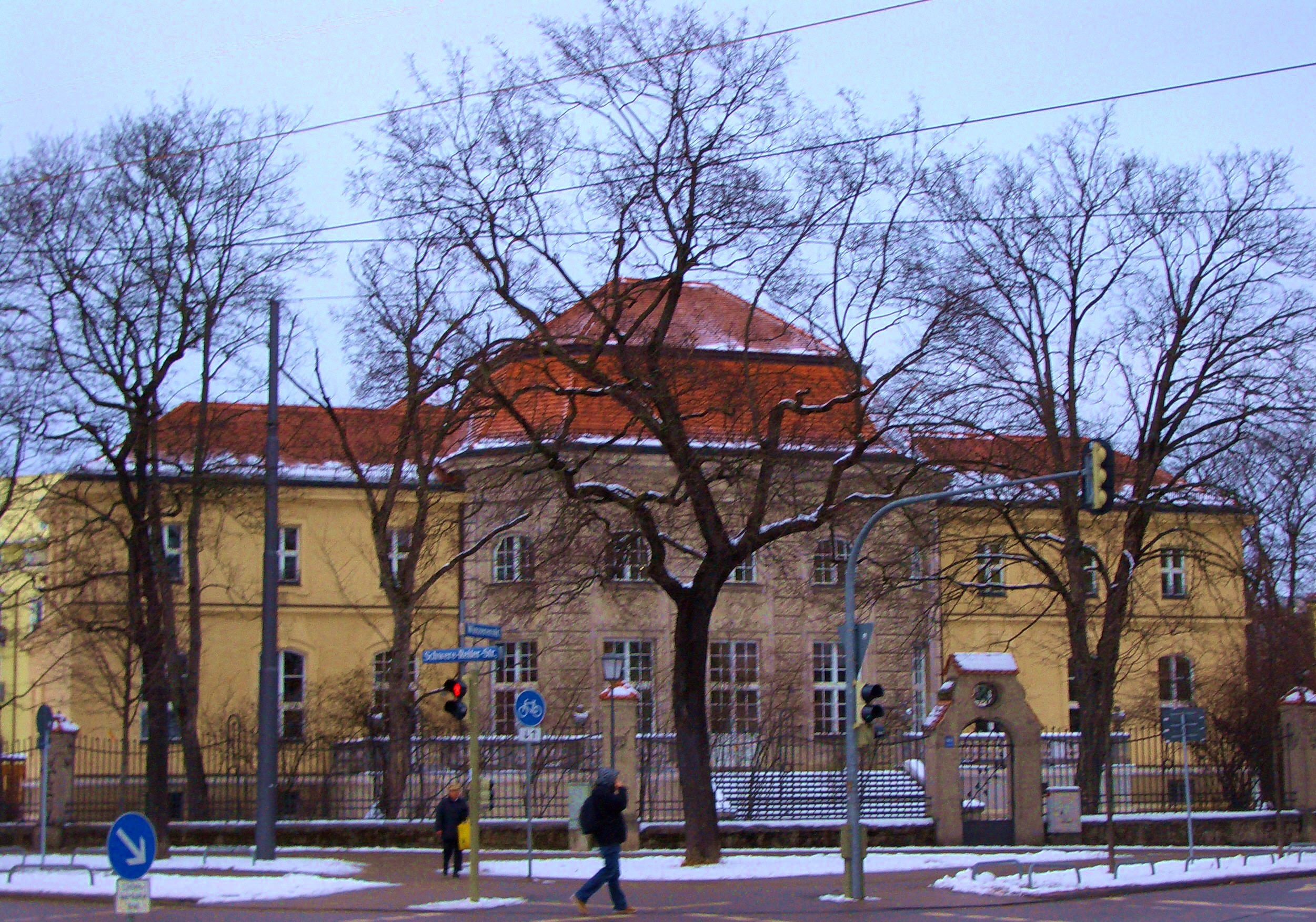
Former casino building of the Prinz-Leopold-Kaserne at the corner of Winzererstraße and Schwere-Reiter-Straße

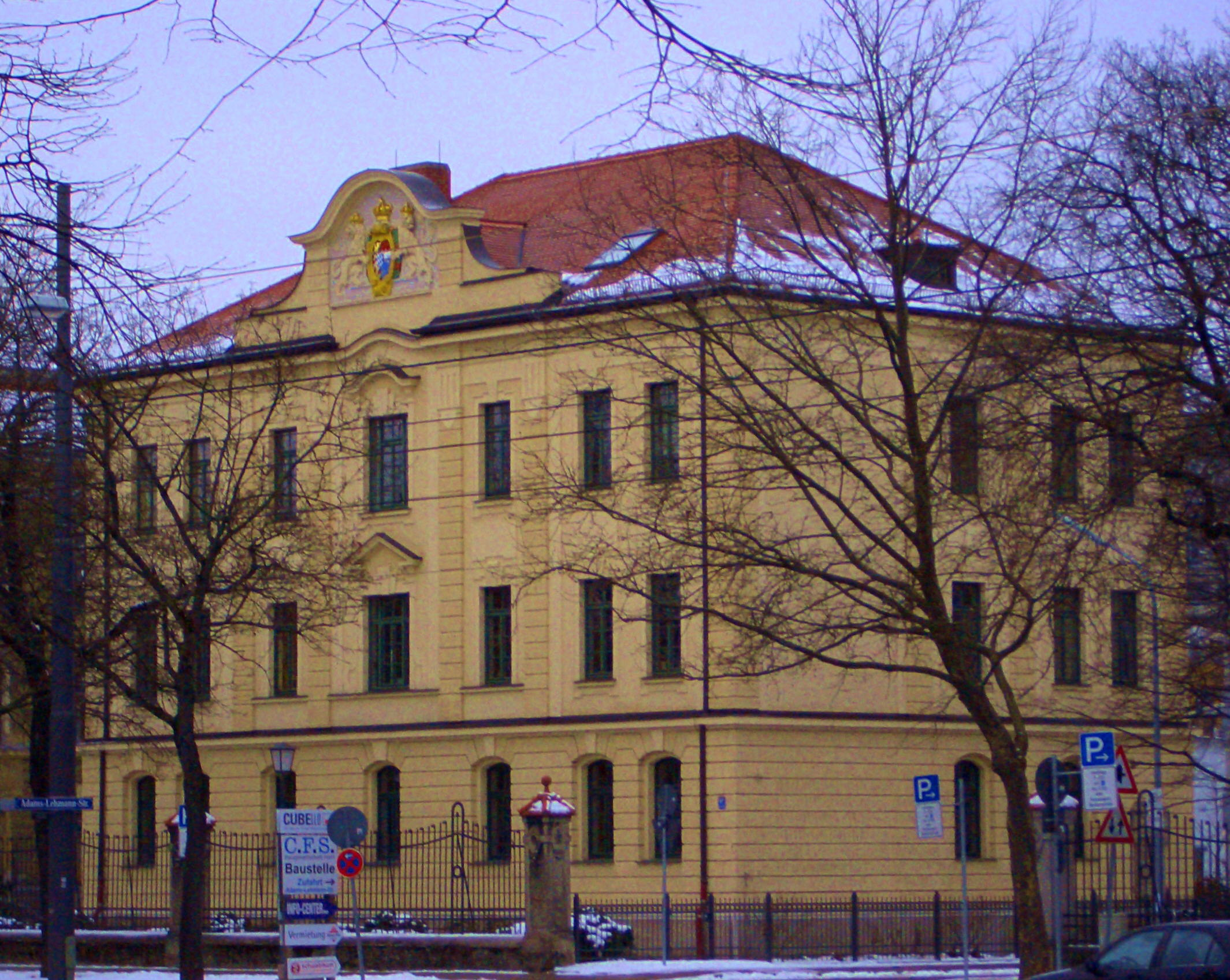
Former staff building of the Prinz-Leopold-Kaserne (Schwere-Reiter-Straße 41)

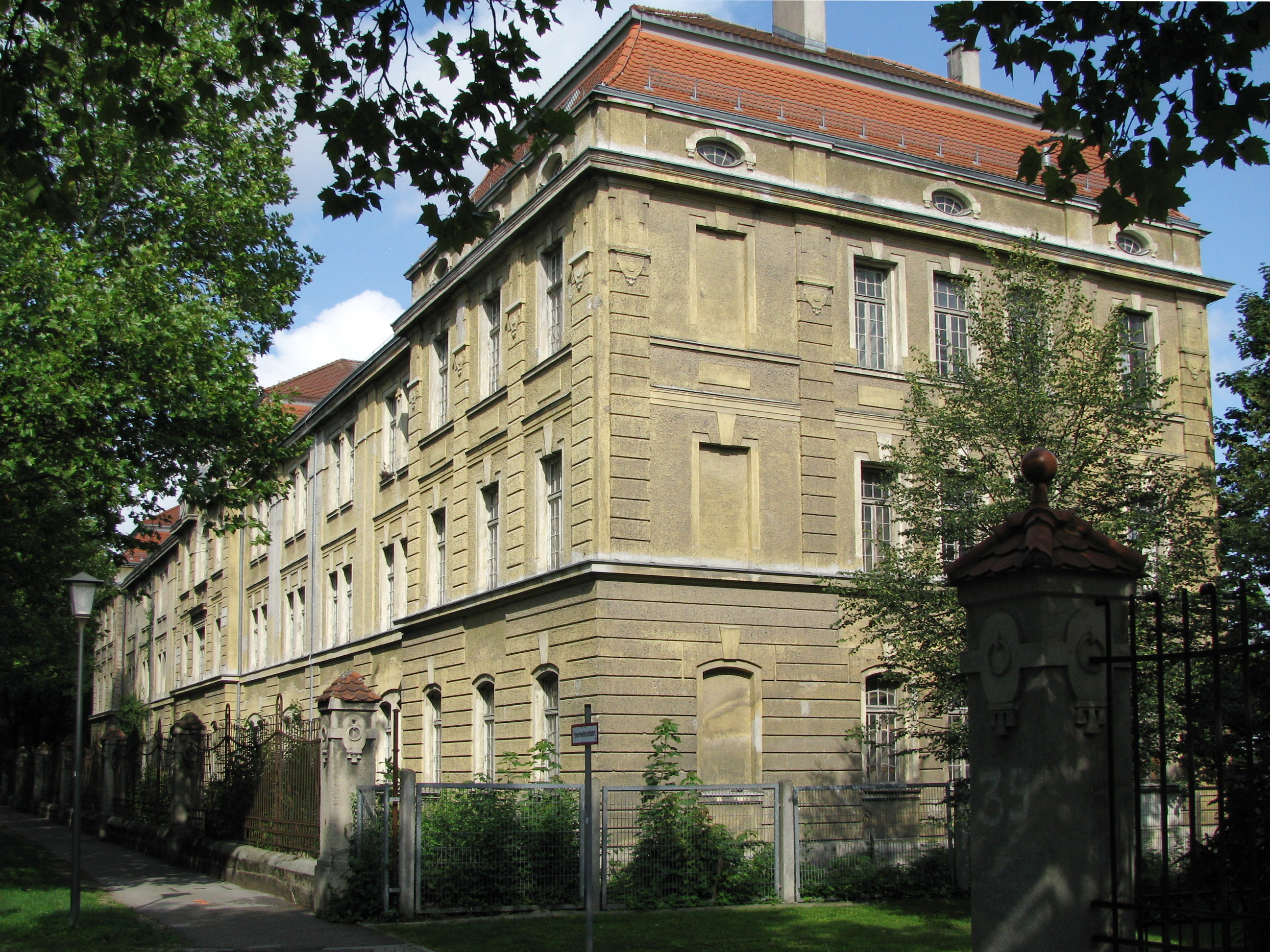
Former team building of the Prinz-Leopold-Kaserne (Schwere-Reiter-Straße 39)

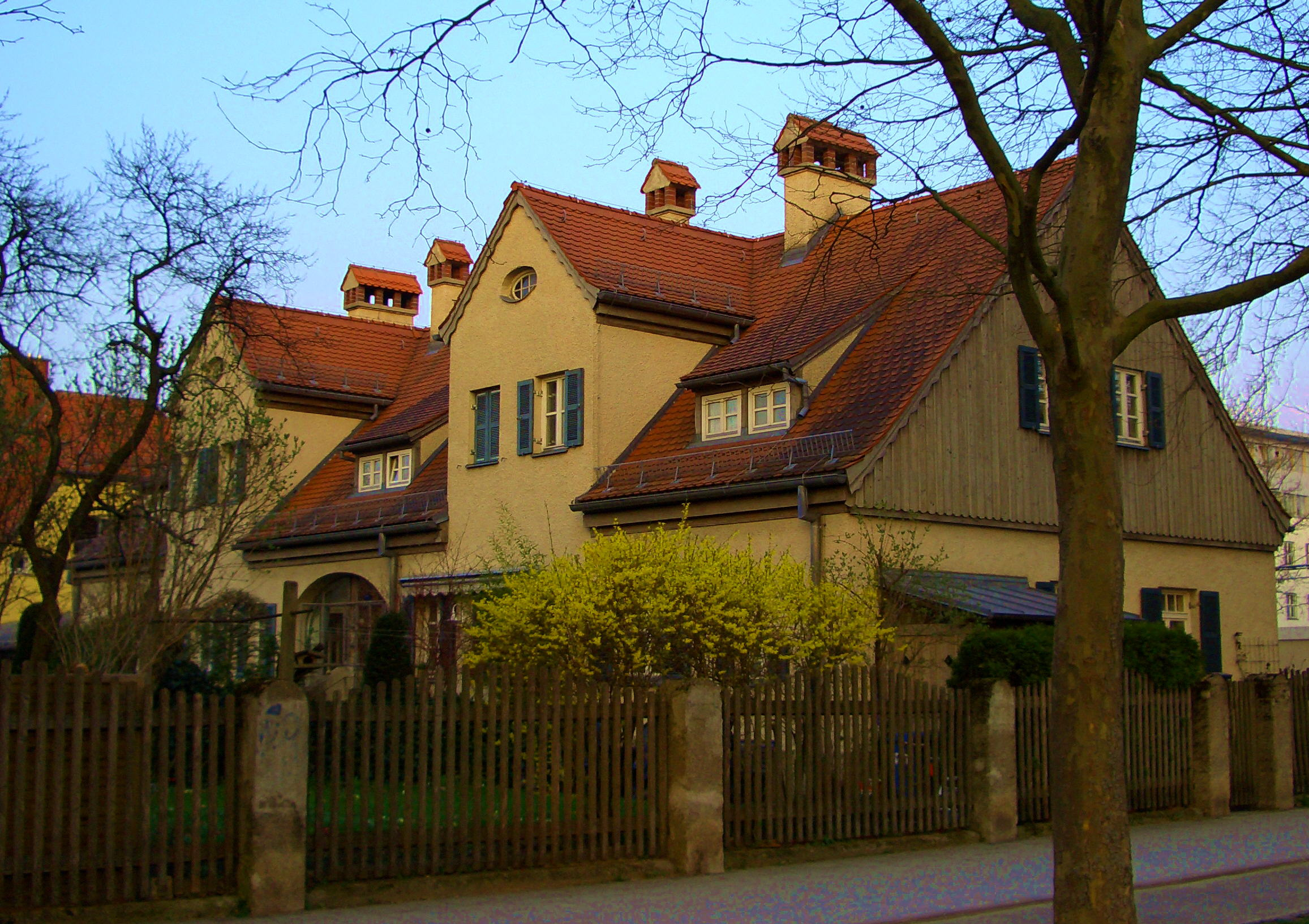
Barbarasiedlung

== History ==
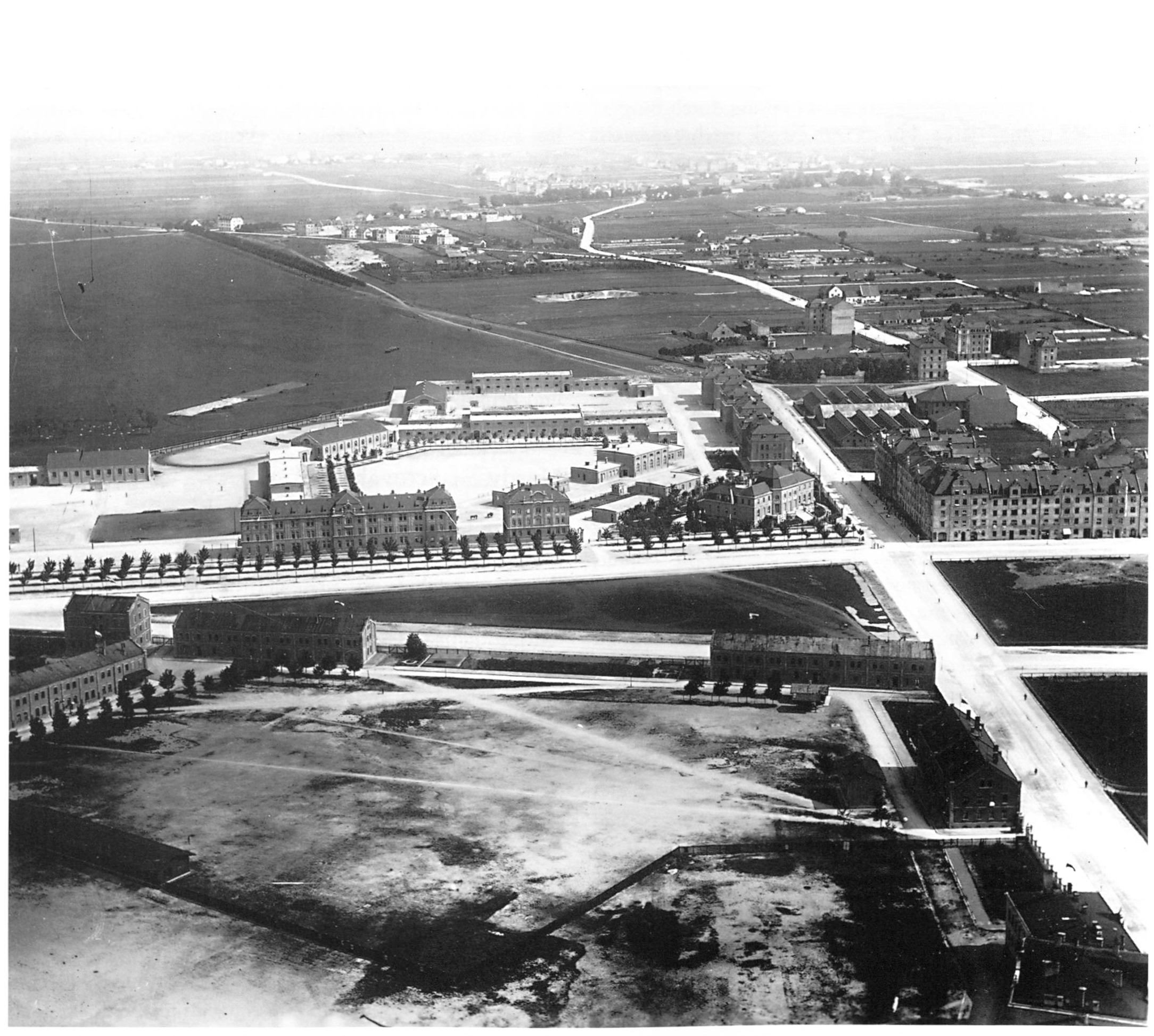
Photo from 1900 with a view from the south on today's Schwere-Reiter-Straße, which runs from left to right through the picture and crosses Winzererstraße on the right. To the north, the buildings of the Prinz-Leopold-Kaserne

The Oberwiesenfeld has been used since 1796 as a parade ground, artillery practice area and gunpowder depot. With the numerical increase of the Bavarian armed forces after the army reform of 1804 and the longer training of the soldiers necessary due to the weapon technical development, their accommodation in barracks became necessary. The area around today's Schwere-Reiter-Straße was uninhabited until the end of the 19th century.

In old city plans, the Schwere-Reiter-Straße is still referred to as Leonrodstraße and was renamed in 1938 under the National Socialists, after the 1st Royal Bavarian Heavy Cavalry (Prince Charles of Bavaria's). Originally it was surrounded by military used buildings:

- 1890 the railroad barracks had originated north of the Schwere-Reiter-Straße and east the Dachauer Straße
- The artillery workshops were located at today's corner of Dachauer Straße and Schwere-Reiter-Straße.
- East next to it, the airship barracks (Luitpoldkaserne) was built in 1896 south of the Schwere-Reiter-Straße and expanded in 1935 around the Barackenkasernement Oberwiesenfeld.
- The typhoid epidemic of 1893, which at the same time broke out in several inner-city barracks because of the catastrophic sanitary conditions, led to a transfer of the military to the outskirts of the city and to the expansion of the barracks at the Oberwiesenfeld, especially the infantry barracks south of the Schwere-Reiter-straße and west of Dachauer Straße.
- In 1902, the Prinz-Leopold-Kaserne was moved north of the Schwere-Reiter-Straße.
- On the opposite side of the today's Schwere-Reiter-Straße, up to the Winzererstraße and to the Lothstraße, was the barracks of the Royal Bavarian 2nd Infantry Regiment "Kronprinz".
- 1912-1914 diagonally across from the casino of the Prince Leopold barracks, Hans Grässel municipal military office was built.
- North of the Schwere-Reiter- Straße or south of the Oberwiesenfeldes, the Stetten barracks (Later Indiana Depot) was built in 1931.
- 1934 followed immediately beside it, the Waldmann barracks (later Jensen Barracks).

From 1909 to 1918 the Barbarasiedlung was built for servants of the military clothing office at the corner of Schwere-Reiter-Straße to Infanteriestraße, since the service building on the grounds of Barackenkasernements Oberwiesenfeld was no longer sufficient for the craftsmen of the Corps Clothing Department. The settlement, which is now owned by the Free State of Bavaria, was awarded in 1993 in the Munich Facade Competition. Since 1920, the former municipal Wehramt houses the city archives.

The casino ("Offizierspiseansalt") at Winzererstraße 41 - in the 1980s, until a fire, was temporarily used as a chemical factory - what later became a popular film site, for example by director Rainer Werner Fassbinder or for Schimanski-Tatorts. At that time, the filmmakers had simply completed the arduous walls for the shooting with papier-mâché and the like. Today, the historically protected building is used as a canteen of the State Building Office Freising, as well as a "Casino am Nordbad" for cultural events.

From the abandoned in 1994 Stettenkaserne, is only a seven-story accommodation building built in 1960, which was converted into a dormitory with 245 homes. In 1966, the renewel-planning of large parts of the Oberwiesenfeld into the Olympic Park Munich for the 1972 Summer Olympics took place. The area of Waldmann-, Stetten- and Prinz-Leopold-Kaserne was converted, except for the historically protected buildings and the dormitory, from 2002 to 2016 into the new urban quarter "Am Ackermannbogen" with about 2250 apartments and around 550 workplaces on 39.5 hectares.

The buildings of the former Luitpoldkaserne are now used as "Kreativquartier Schwabing", since 1993 it is home of the "Urban Dance and Theater Stage Schwere Reiter" and the "Studio House". The 1894 built former training hall in Romanesque style with numerous round arched windows, became a venue in 1994 for the "Reithalle München" with a performance of the Oresteia by Peter Stein.

== Sports facility ==
The home ground of the association football team FC Teutonia Munich is located just to the north of the Schwere-Reiter-Straße and takes the name the Schwere-Reiter-Straße Club Sports Facility. It was opened on 9 March 1951 by the Bavarian Motorsport Association (BBM) and was called the BBM Stadium at the time. It hosted significant motorcycle speedway events including qualifying rounds of the Speedway World Championship in 1952, 1959 and 1960, in addition to the German Individual Speedway Championship. The racing continued until 1970 before the track was demolished, repurposed and used solely by the football team, who had moved there in 1955.
