= Dachauer Straße =

Longest street in Munich, Germany

Coordinates: 48°08′40″N 11°33′35″E

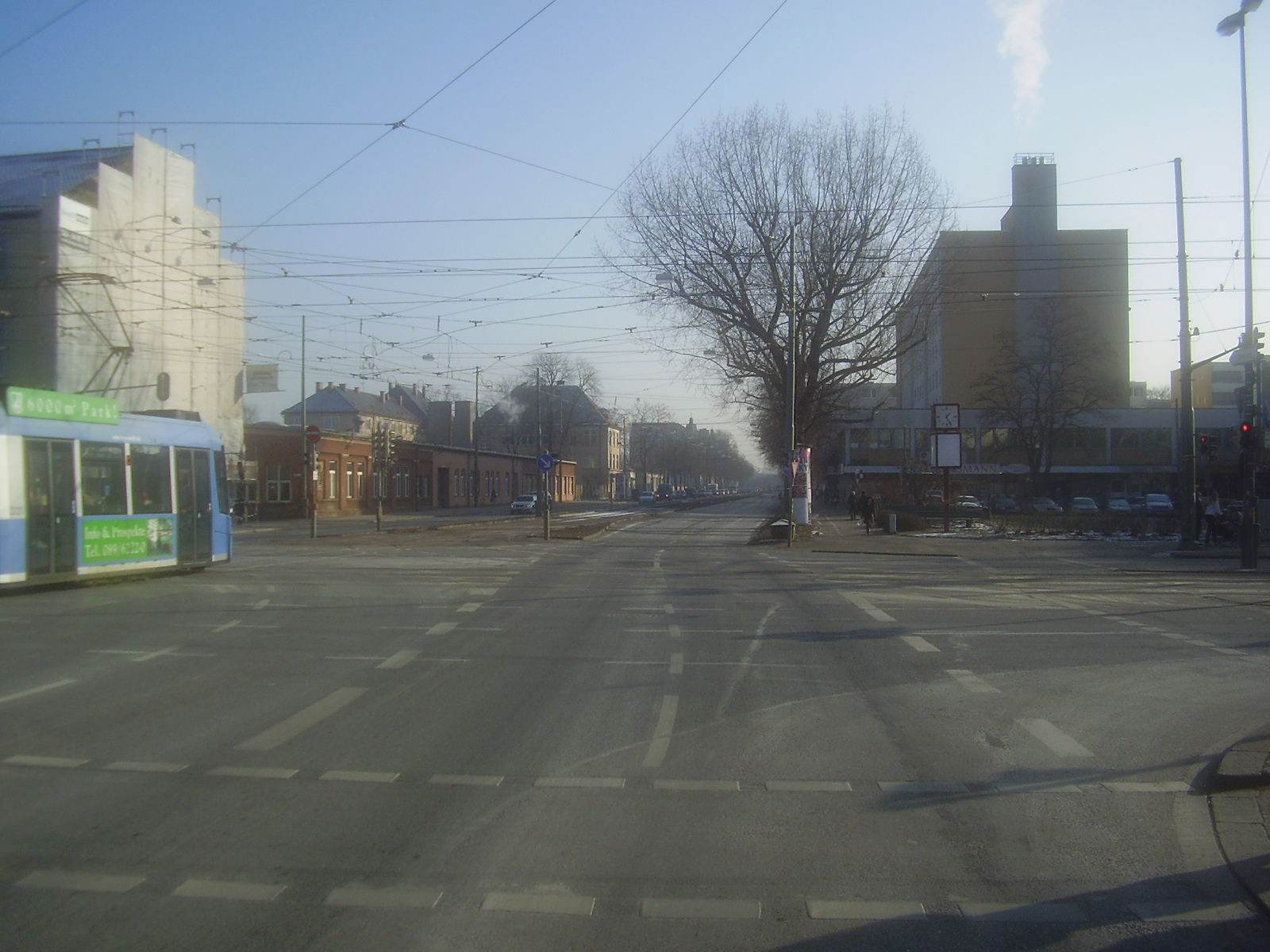
Dachauer Straße (Leonrodplatz)

The Dachauer Straße is the longest street in Munich, Germany with a length of 11.2 km and it received its name since it is the connecting road to Dachau Palace. In the north of Munich, it is part of the Bundesstraße 304.

== Route ==
The Dachauer Straße begins today as a track-leading street of the tram lines 20 and 21 north of the Bahnhofplatz in the district of Maxvorstadt. Until 1877, the southern part of today's Dachauer Sraße to the height of Marsstraße was still part of the Schützenstraße. From Hirtenstraße, the Dachauer Straße then also serves for use by motor vehicle traffic, until Elisenstraße, as a one-lane One-way traffic and then carries on to the Stiglmaierplatz with two opposing lanes. From Stiglmaierplatz, the street picks up the multi-lane traffic coming from the south to Seidlstraße, where it mostly has two lanes through Neuhausen-Nymphenburg, to which it then crosses Leonrodplatz and leads to the height of the Olympic Park under the Landshuter Allee (Mittlerer Ring) through to the district of Moosach. There it crosses at the junction of Wintrich- with the Georg-Brauchle-Ring, at the intersection it once again like the Baubergerstraße and the Pelkovenstraße, continues on with single lanes on both sides and a little further north in Feldmoching-Hasenbergl after a bend below the track of the DB marshalling yard in a western direction, continues as a multi-lane road part of the national road 304. In this bend, the Max-Born-Straße from the East ends here and forms the further course of the national road 304. The Dachauer Straße then leads in a northwesterly direction over the railway tracks and the A 99 to the city or county boundary, where it continues in Karlsfeld under the name Münchner Straße. The northern route of the Dachauer Straße has been changed over time. In the former village Moosach, the old Dachauer Straße ran, since the middle of the 12th century, on the route of the today's Darmstädter, Batzenhofer and Quedlinburger Straße and received there direct route starting in the middle of the 18th century. Due to the construction of the marshalling yard Munich North between 1987 and 1991, the road was routed over the tracks again another 400m to the west.

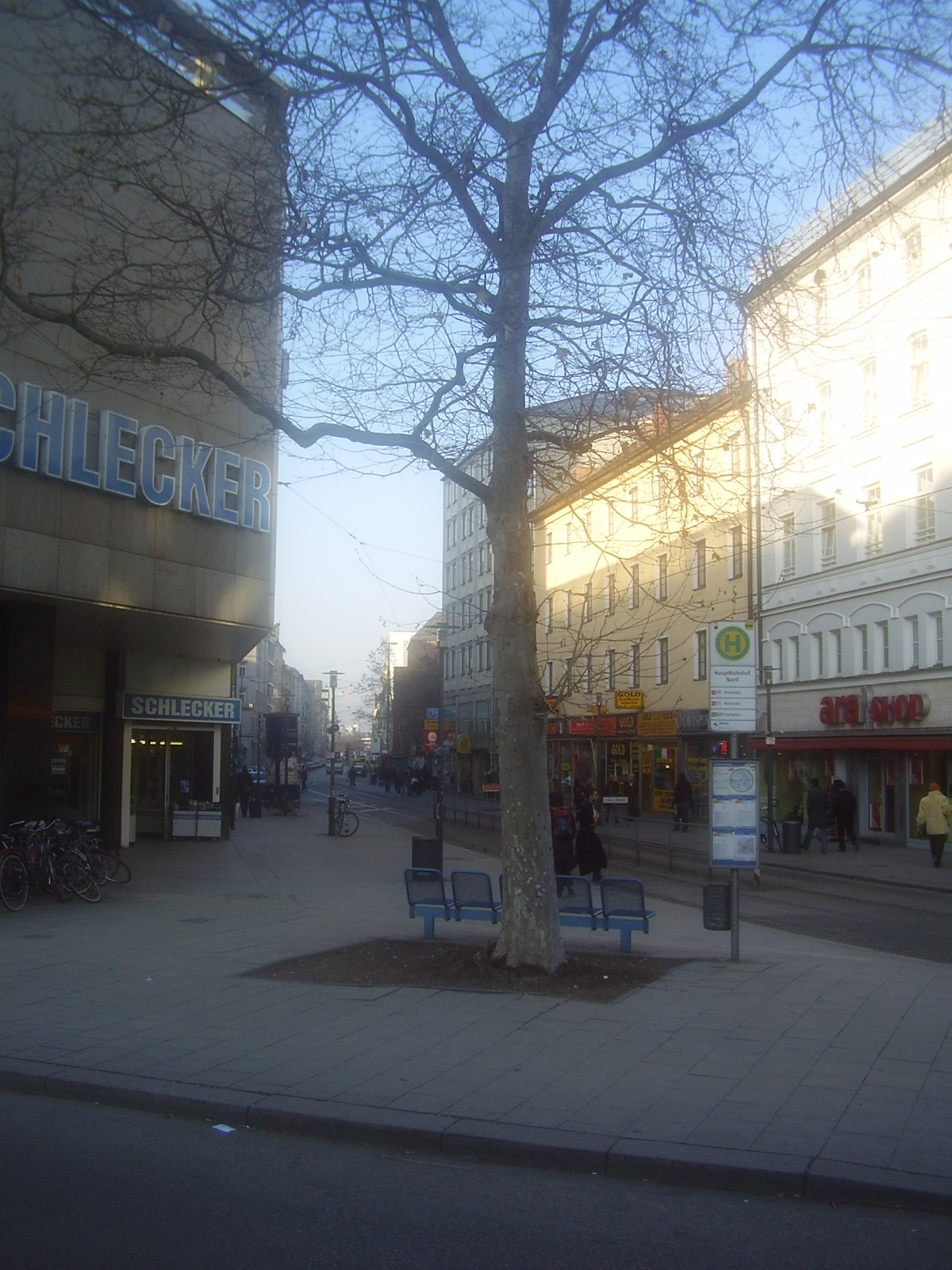
Beginning of Dachauer Straße in the city center

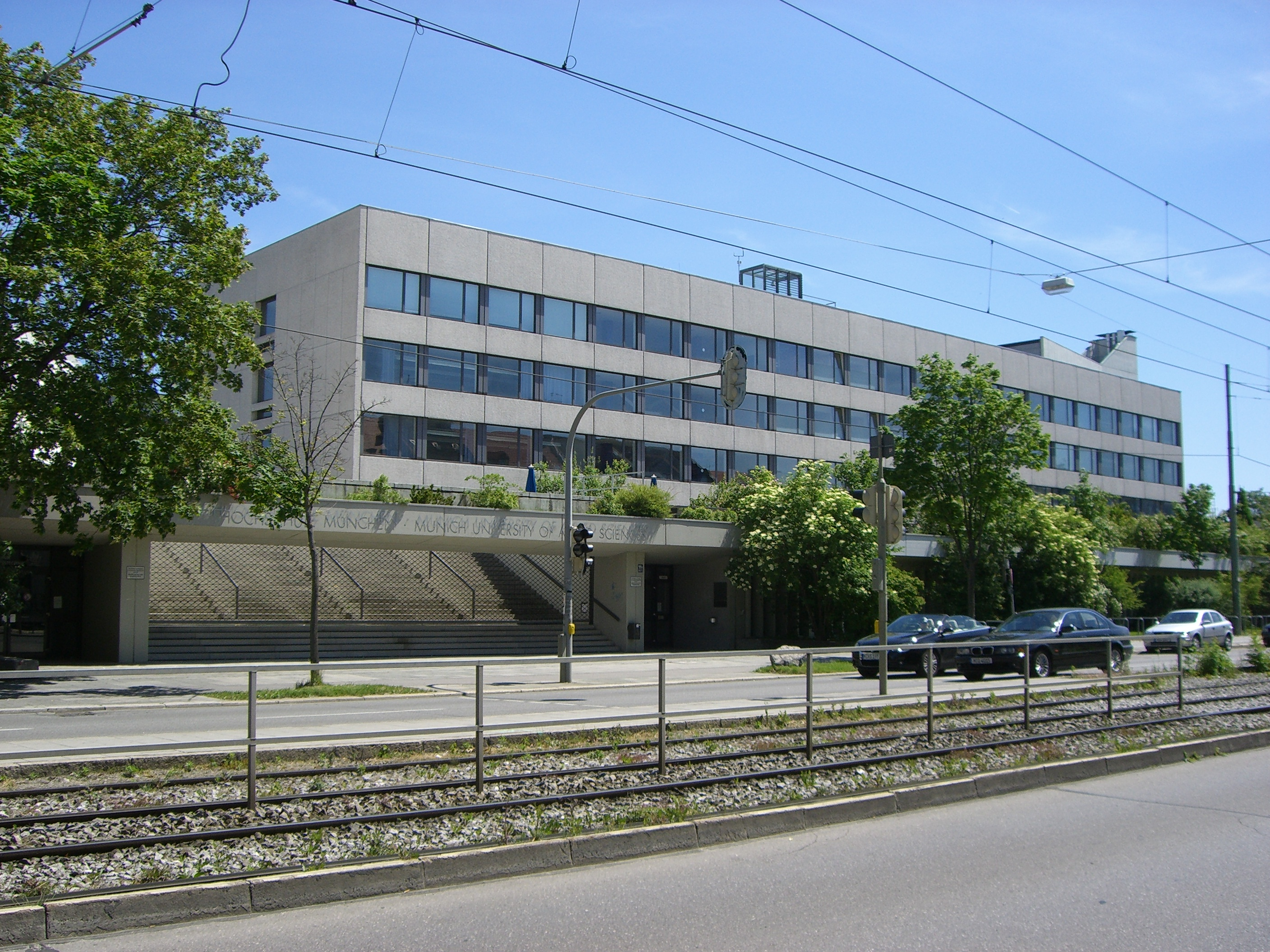
Dachauer Straße in front of the Faculty of Mechanical Engineering, Vehicle Technology, Aircraft Technology of Munich University of Applied Sciences

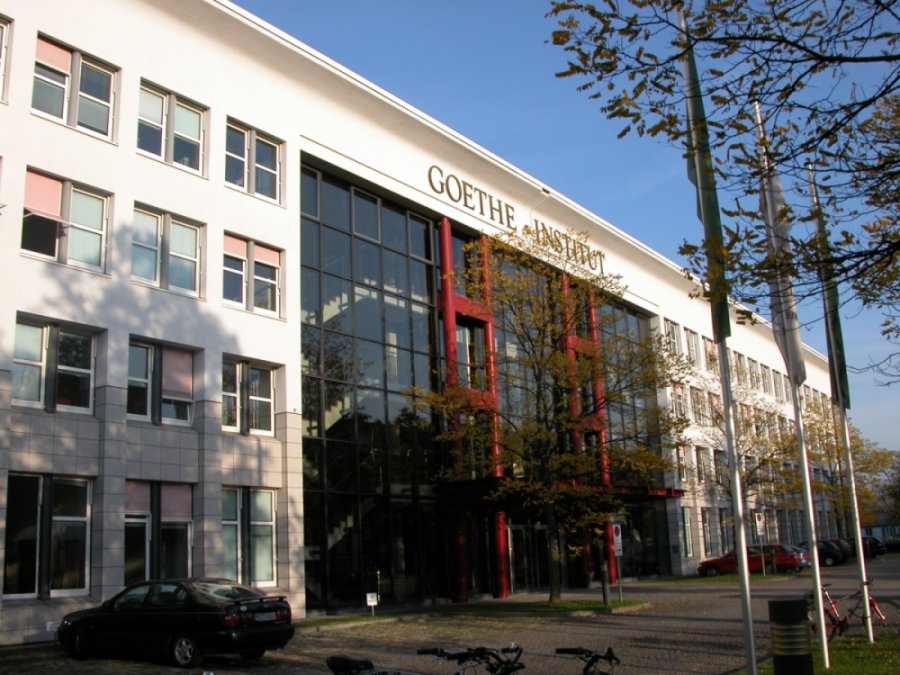
Headquarters of the Goethe-Institut

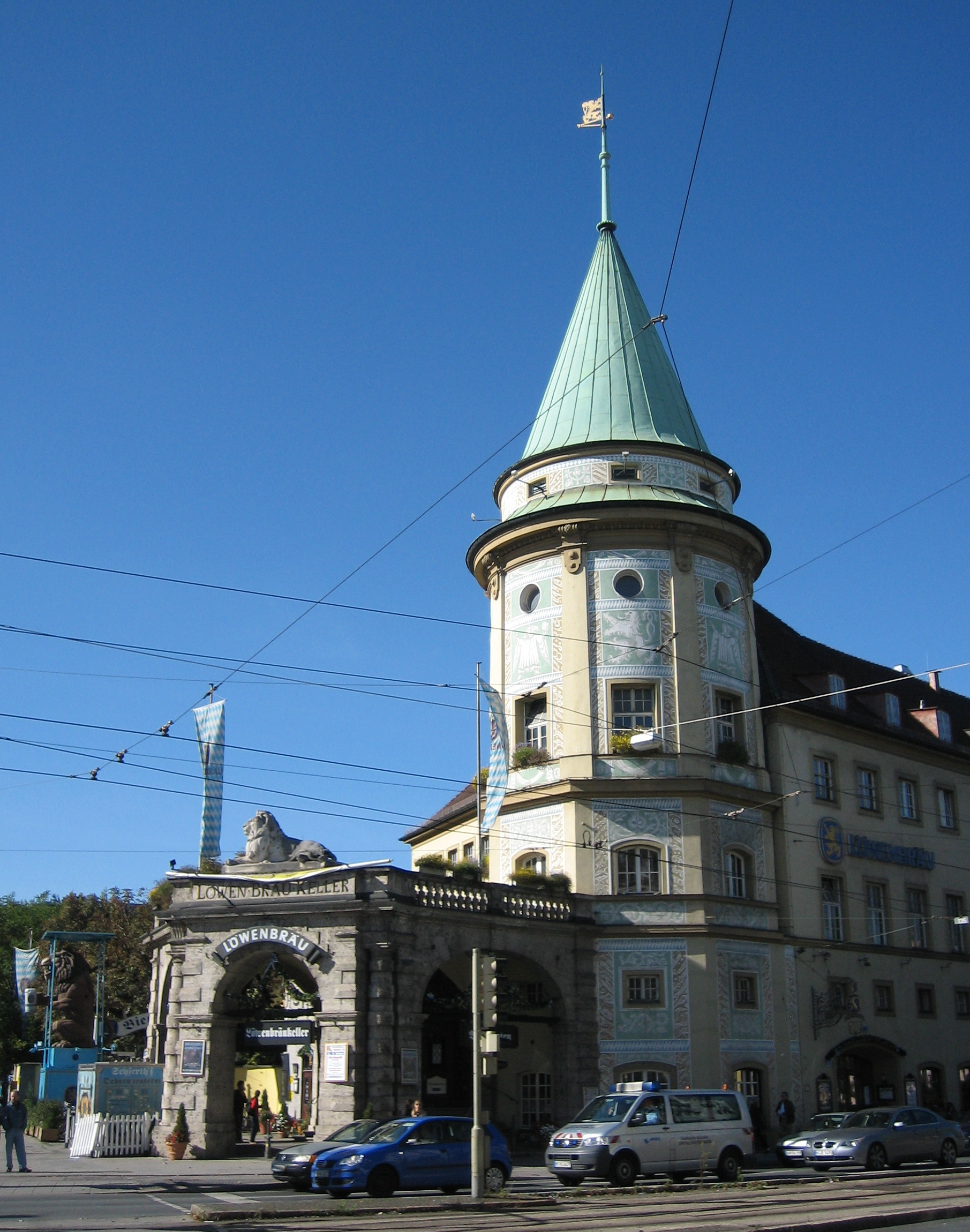
Löwenbräukeller

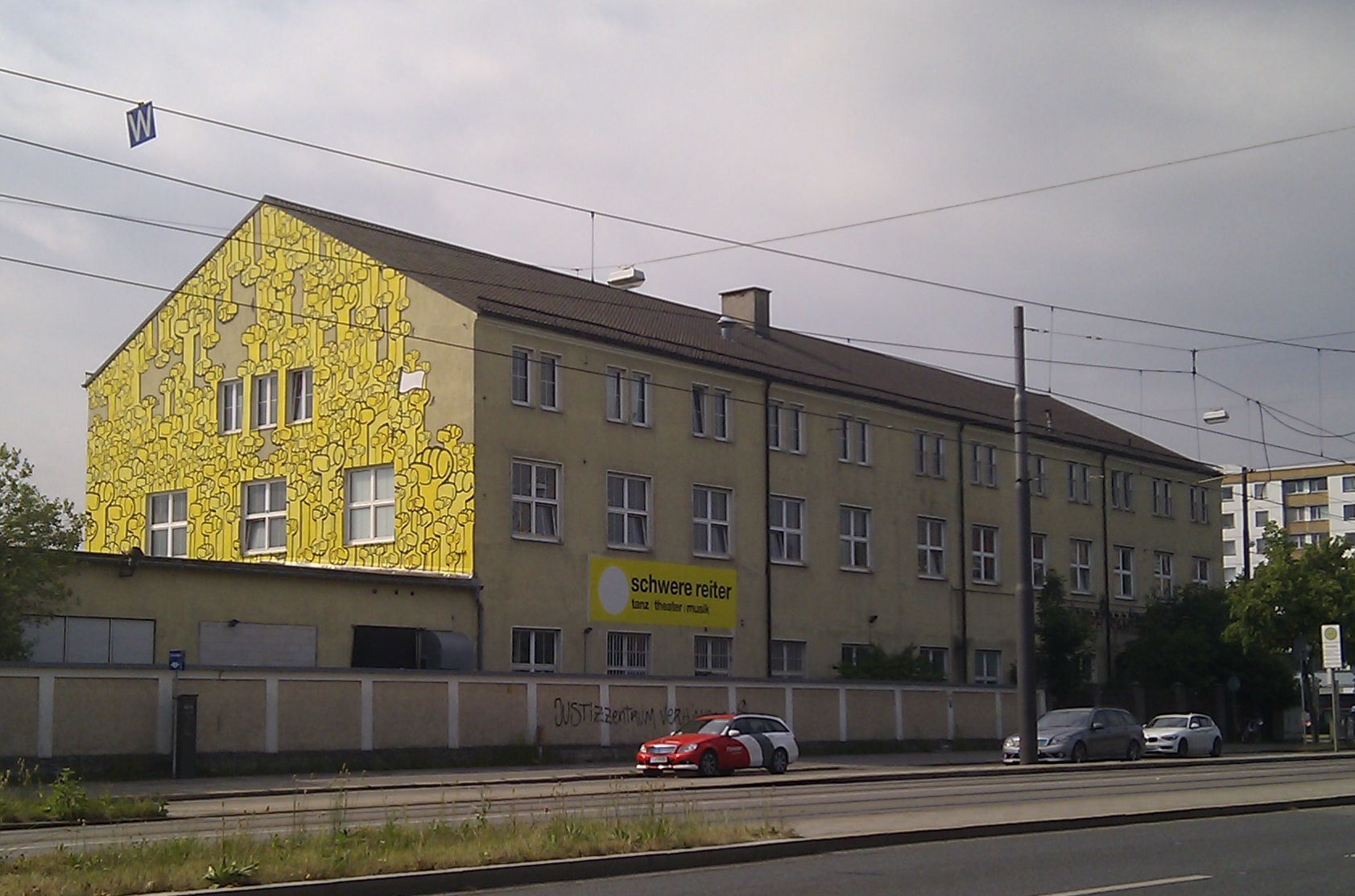
Schwere Reiter Theater

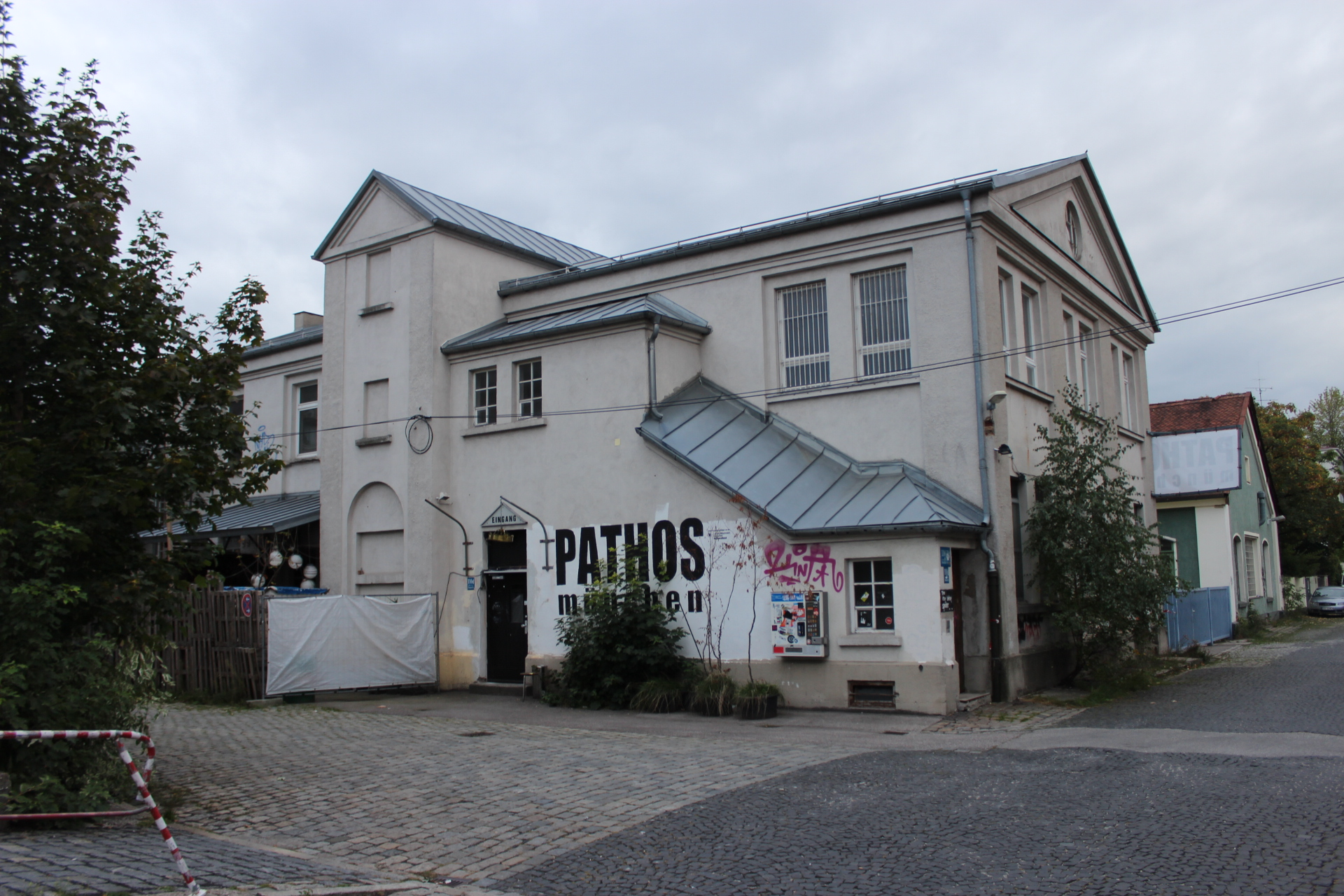
Pathos Theater

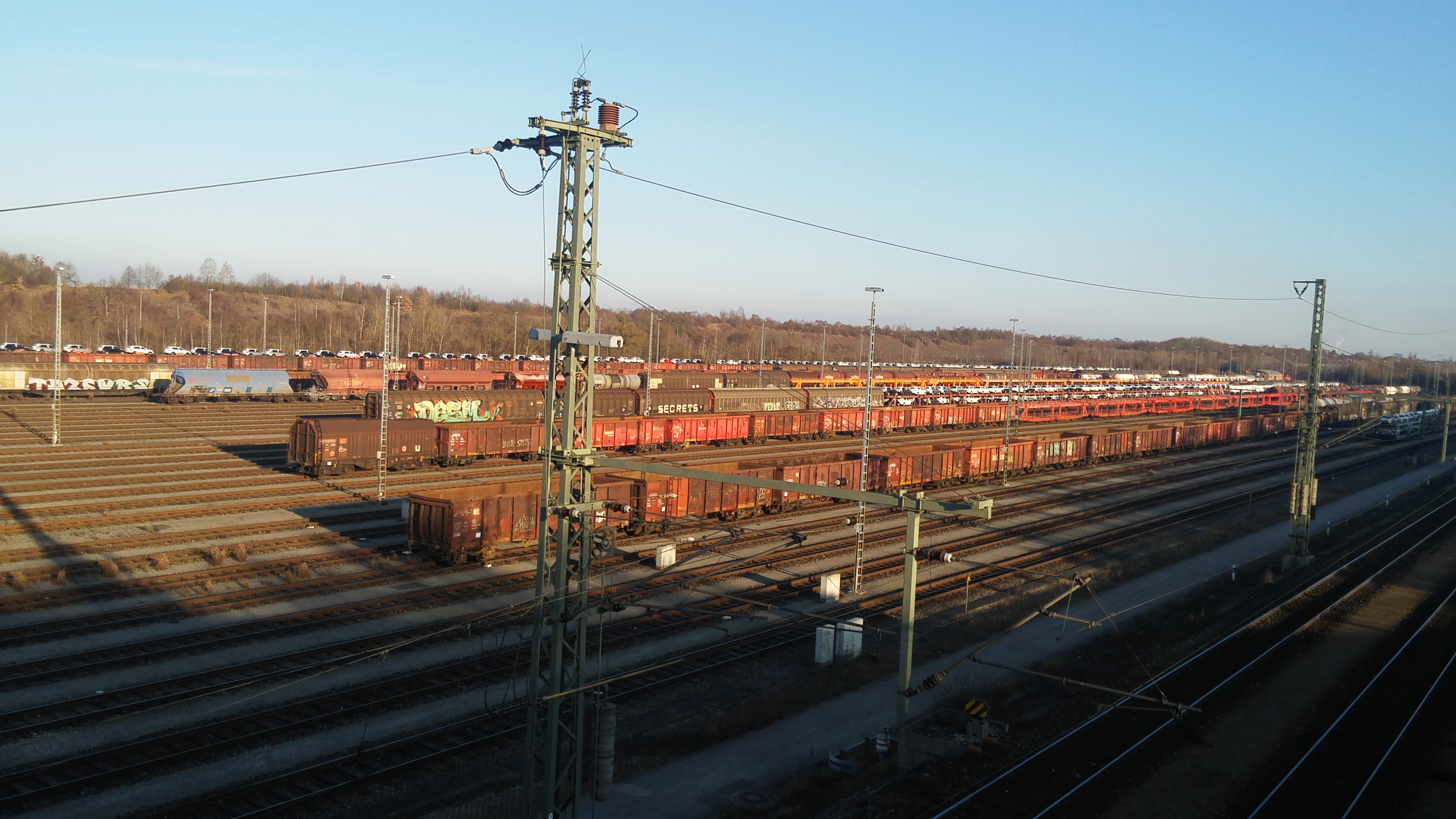
View from the Dachauer Straße to the marshalling yard

== History ==
As of 1448, horse races were held every year during the Jakobidult on the route from Neuhauser Tor to Feldmoching, which is why the route was known until 1878 as "Rennweg". In the Middle Ages, around 1660, the part of the street close to the city bore the name Mosserstraße, derived from "Mossach", since it led from Munich to Moosach.

The structural development of the area more remote from the old town began with the construction of several barracks of the Bavarian Army with its associated infrastructure. Therefore, the then rural environment of Neuhausen was redesigned from the mid-19th century, which brought the district south of the practice area Oberwiesenfeld and north of the parade grounds Marsfeld the name "barracks district" and significantly accelerated the structural change Neuhausens. From 1866, extensive workshops of the royal armory were built along the Dachauer Straße; at times, more than 1,000 workers were employed there. The last still existent military-related institution is the Bundeswehrverwaltungszentrum München (Army Administrative Center Munich). It is located on the site of the former Eisenbahnkaserne (railway barracks) number 128.

In 1869, Adele Spitzeder founded her private bank in Dachauer Straße, which became known as Dachauer Banken. On 21 October 1876, the first Munich horse tram passed on its route from Promenadeplatz to Nymphenburger Straße/Burgfriedensgrenze (Maillingerstraße) the Dachauer Straße between Bahnhofplatz and Stiglmaierplatz. In 1898, the west bordering cemetery was built. In 1900 the tram route from 1876 was made electric. On the western side opposite the Bundeswehrverwaltungszentrum München (Army Administrative Center Munich), the Association for the Improvement of Housing in Munich built a small residential complex in the Ebenau district even before the First World War, which was used as one of the early examples of non-profit housing construction in Munich. In 1905, the current Heinz Naumann House (number 25) was built by Michael Reifenstuel, which then served as a posthospital. After the former gas works on the Thalkirchner road and the Kirchstein (now Vogelweideplatz) could not keep up with the growing gas demand of the city, the construction of the gas works Moosach, now number 148, began in 1906. On 25 July 1909, the new tram connection from Stiglmaier to Leonrodplatz was first used. In the restaurant "Zum Deutschen Reich", located on Dachauer Straße, the German Workers' Party organized meetings in 1919 and 1920, with Adolf Hitler as speaker. Between 1924 and 1929, the Borstei was built north of the Middle Ring. In 1928, depot 5 for trams was completed in the Dachauer Straße 104, which was put back into service in 1949 after the damages from the war were repaired and then shut down in 1977. After request of the realm aviation ministry from 1936, development took place on the current factory premises of MTU Aero Engines (Dachauer Straße 665) and MAN commercial vehicles (Dachauer Straße 667) another BMW factory, which produced the 801 engine starting in 1942. During the period of National Socialism, innumerable so-called protective prisoners were deported via the Dachauer Straße to the Dachau concentration camp. After a bomb attack by the Allies in 1943, the gas plant was severely damaged. The ordered demolition of the plant was prevented by the factory management. After the war, the plant had to be shut down for half a year because of the damages caused by the war. After the conversion of the gas supply to Roherd gas took place on 10 November 1975, the plant was closed. In 2008, sections of the tram tracks in Dachauer Straße were renewed.

The that post stable of the city was also located on the street. The former post office on Dachauer Straße was built by Franz Holzhammer. In addition, Dachauer Straße 90 is home to the Municipal Health Department and the blood doner service of the Städtische Klinikum München GmbH. In the former buildings of the police driving school, the department city center of the Munich Fire Department is temporarily accommodated there for some years.

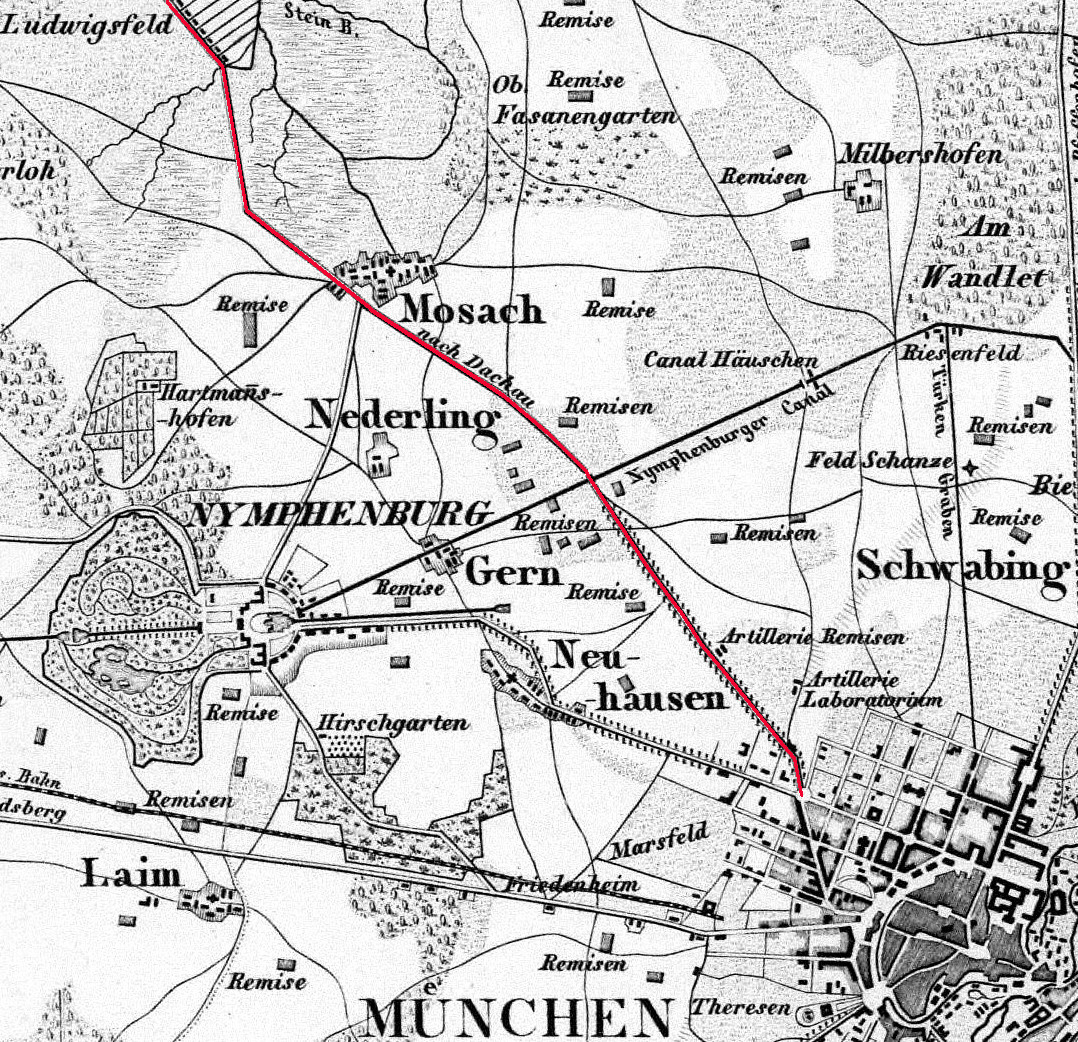
Road from Stiglmaierplatz towards Dachau 1856

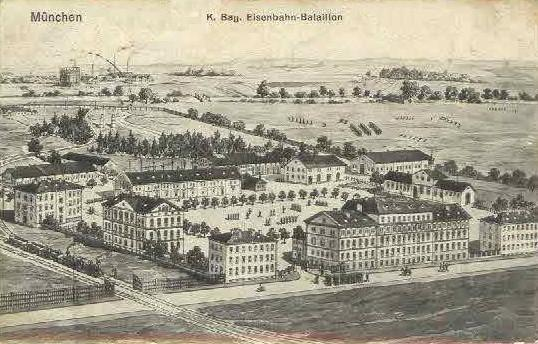
On the left in the picture, the railway tracks in front of the railroad barracks, where today the eastern street lane runs of the now-developed Dachauer Straße.

== Educational institutions ==
In 1951, an elementary school was built on the Dachauer Straße for the children of the Ludwigsfelder camp, and in 1963, at number 98, a primary school was built. In addition, the Munich Educational Plant is located at Dachauer Straße 5 and the Faculty of Mechanical Engineering, Vehicle Technology and Aircraft Engineering at the Munich University of Applied Sciences at Dachauer Straße 98b.

== Culture ==
In the area of gastronomy, located next to the Löwenbräukeller at the intersecting Stiglmaierplatz is one of the oldest guest houses in Munich called "Alter Wirt" in Moosach, which was first documented in 1442 as a Täfernhaus. In 1906, Carl Gabriel had the first Lichtspielhaus (Movie theater) in Munich built on Dachauer Straße under the name "The American Bio.-Cie.", which still exists today after several renovations under the name of Gabriel Filmtheater. Even after the First World War, the Apollo Theater (house numbers 19/21) is located opposite the confluence of Augustenstraße. The actor Karl Valentin performed on stage at the "Baderwirt" under the name "Skeleton Giggerl". Since the early 1980s, the Munich Theater for children, which was previously housed on the Leopoldstraße, is located in the building of the former Regina-Lichtspielhauses at Dachauer Straße 46 and in 1982, the Pathos Transport Theater was founded on Dachauer Straße 110 d. In the 1980s, parts of the abandoned military properties in Dachauer Straße 128, which now houses a housing estate and the headquarters of the Goethe-Institut, were used for theater and event purposes. Where the artillery workshops were before the Second World War, was until the renovations were completed on the main building, a theater of the Munich Kammerspiele in a converted industrial hall of Stadtwerke München which was classified as a demolition object and only provisionally kept intact. From the spring of 2003 until the beginning of 2010, the event technology of the cultural department and the rooms of the Academy of Fine Arts were housed in the same property on Dachauer Straße 114. There today is the Schwere Reiter Theater.

== Trivia ==
- During the time of National Socialism, Karl Valentin asked the ironic question of what was probably the longest street and answered it with "The Dachauer Straße, of course, since many go out and hardly anyone comes back - from the concentration camp".

- At the corner of Lampadiusstraße is still an original street sign with the name written in German type.
