= Maximilian-II-Kaserne =

Military facility in Munich, Germany

Coordinates: 48°9′19″N 11°32′47″E

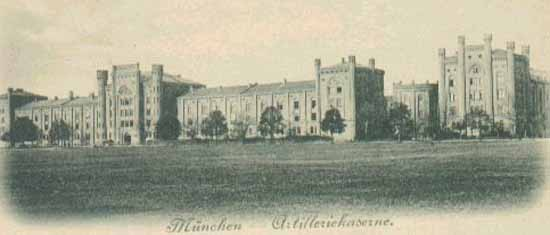
Max-II-Kaserne, 1890

The Maximilian-II-Kaserne respectively Max-II-Kaserne was a military facility in Munich, Germany, which was completed in 1865. The kaserne was named after Maximilian II of Bavaria.

The barracks were the largest ones that have ever been built in Munich. They were primarily used by some field artillery regiments and the 1st Train Detachment of the Bavarian army. Between the World Wars the barracks were used by the Bavarian State Police, and in Nazi Germany by the Kraftfahr-Ersatz-Abteilung 7 (Motor Reserve Detachment 7) and by the Kraftfahr-Ausbildungs-Abteilung 7 (Motor Training Detachment 7). The symmetrical main building with its 600 meters width was planned by the architect M. Berger, and some facades were designed by Eduard Riedel. The facility was destroyed in the Second World War.

== Location ==
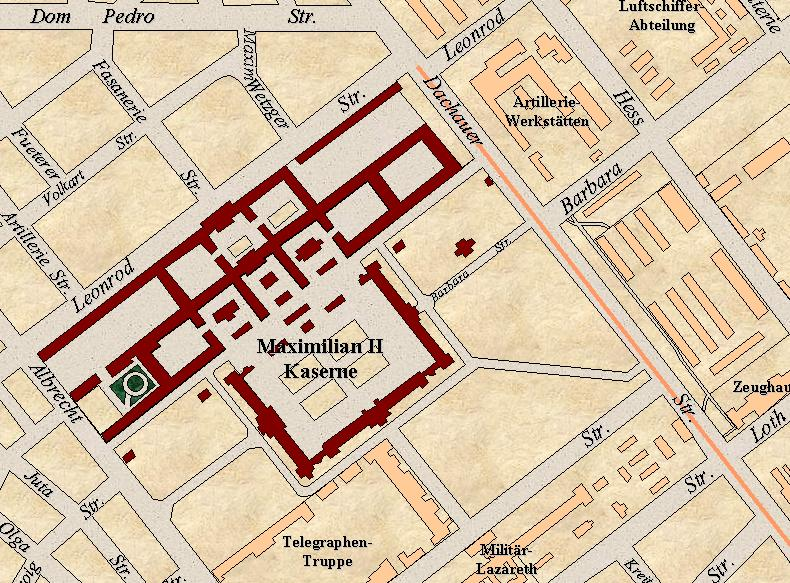
Map of 1922

Currently only the courses of the streets remember of the former barracks. The area is now covered with residential and commercial buildings. A monument at Hiblestraße remembers of the then stationed artillery units.

Originally the Max-II-Kaserne was built in the rural North of the old town near the artillery training area Oberwiesenfeld in the South of today's Leonrodplatz. In the South of the Max-II-Kaserne bordered the barracks of the telegraph troops.

== See also ==
- List of barracks in Munich
