= Eduard Riedel =

German architect (1813-1885)

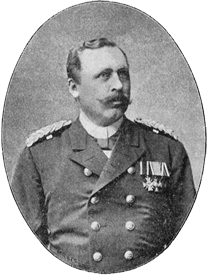
Eduard Riedel

Eduard Riedel (February 1, 1813 – August 24, 1885) was a German architect and Bavarian government building officer. Among other things he is known for his contribution to the construction of Neuschwanstein Castle.

== Career ==
Riedel was born in Bayreuth. He began to study architecture in Bayreuth and graduated in Munich, the Bavarian capital, in 1834.

Riedel's first project was the supervision of the new development of the Ludwigstraße Damenstift in Munich. This was followed by the residence and palace garden for King Otto of Greece in Athens, where he was court architect until he returned to Munich in 1850. Here he completed the Propylaea jointly with Leo von Klenze.

From 1852 until 1857, Riedel was a professor at the polytechnic institute.

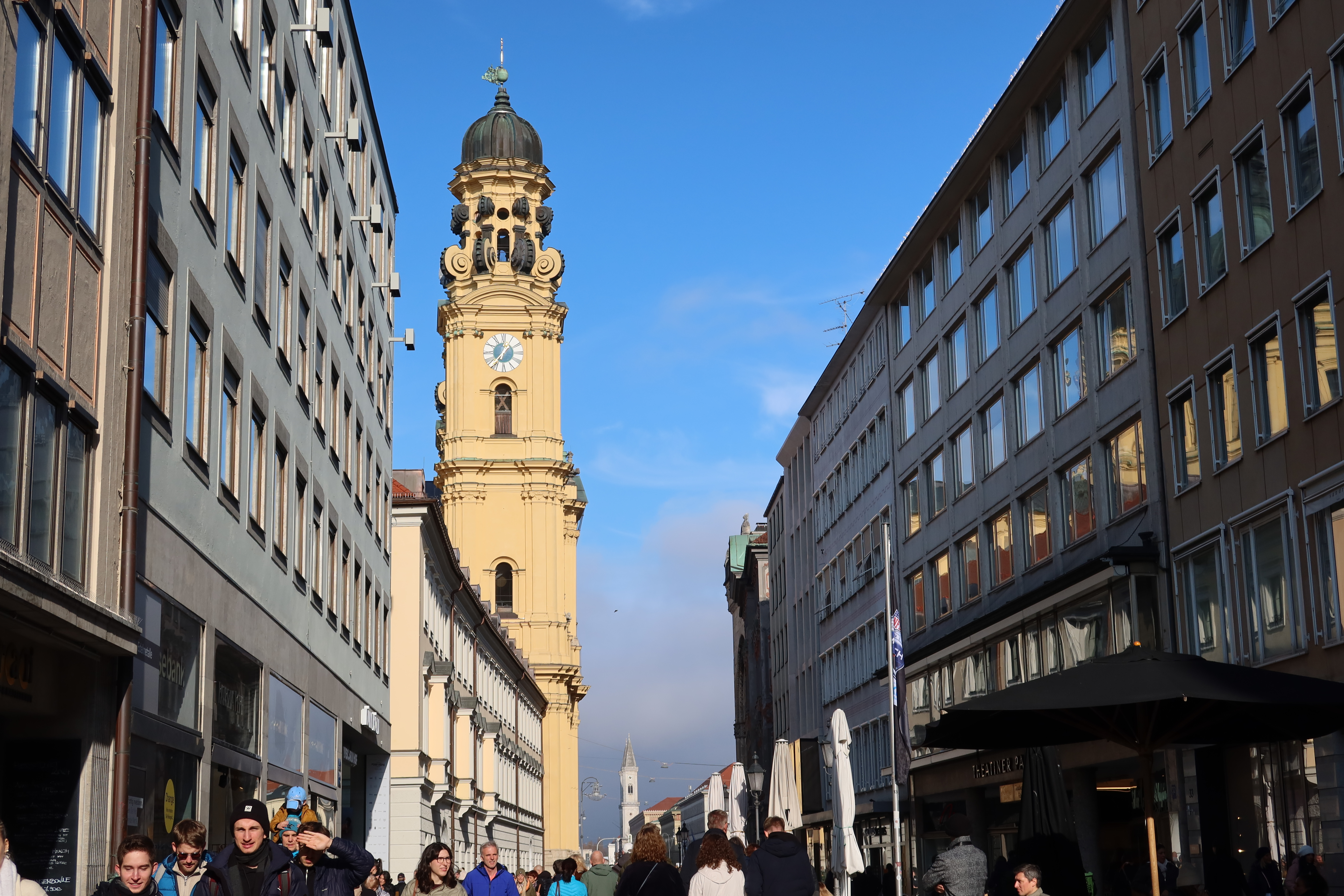
The Theatinerstraße showing the Theatinerkirche in Munich

In 1853 he was appointed superintendent of the royal building authorities and in 1872 he became the leading court architect. His works include the Wolfram von Eschenbach Monument in Wolframs-Eschenbach, numerous fountains in the garden of Schleissheim Palace, the Beamtenreliktanstalt and Bavarian National Museum in Munich, as well as numerous drafts and concepts such as for the Cistercian monastery in Mehringen, a new university and a coin. He was also responsible for the restoration of numerous palaces.

Riedel died in Starnberg.

== Collaboration with King Ludwig II ==
Riedel's collaboration with King Ludwig II was defined by the challenge of translating the King's romanticized visions into structural reality. For Neuschwanstein Castle, Riedel was tasked with executing designs that were originally conceived as theatrical stage sets by Christian Jank. This required Riedel to bridge the gap between scenic illusion and architectural stability, often pushing the engineering limits of the time to satisfy the King's insistence on aesthetic perfection over traditional function.

== Oeuvre (selection) ==
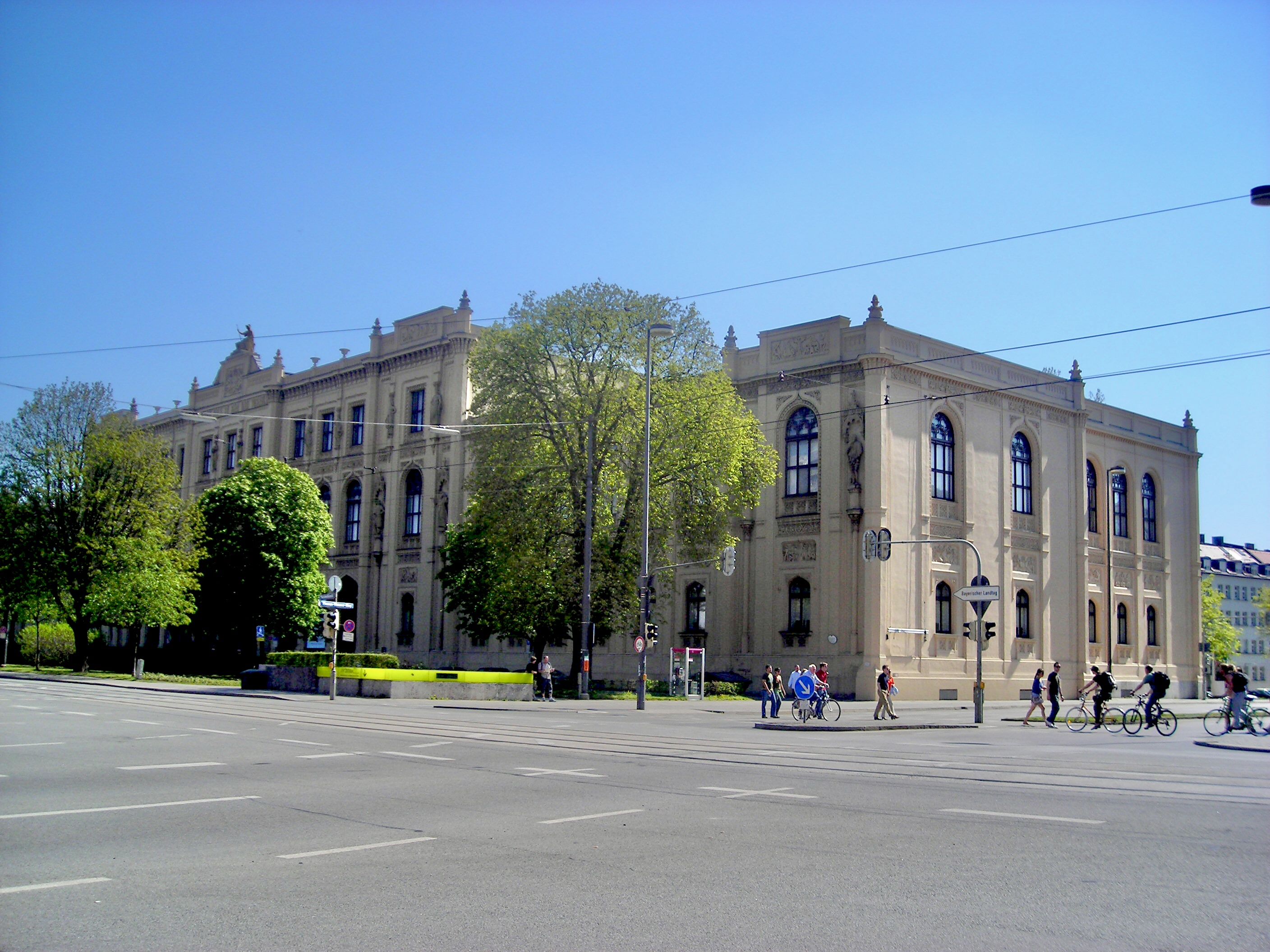
Munich, Riedel's building of Bavarian National Museum, now housing State Museum of Ethnology

- 1848-1864: Concepts for the grave of Maximilian II of Bavaria
- 1849-1851: Reconstruction of Berg Castle on Lake Starnberg
- 1852-1853: Completion of the Casino on the Roseninsel in Lake Starnberg
- 1852-1877: Concepts for the front of the Maximilian-II-Kaserne in Munich
- 1854-1856: Extension of Leo von Klenze's bazaar building at Odeonsplatz, Munich
- 1856-1858: Reconstruction of Herzog Max Castle in Munich
- 1857: Royal hunting house near Ettal
- 1859-1863: Bavarian National Museum, now housing the State Museum of Ethnology in Munich
- 1861-1863: Concepts for front of the Neue Kaserne (New Barracks) in Regensburg
- 1862: Concepts for gardens of Feldafing Palace
- 1862-1863: Concepts for new university at Karlsplatz in Munich
- 1863-1865: Beamtenreliktanstalt in Munich
- 1864: Mausoleum for Maximilian II in Theatine Church, Munich
- 1869-1874: Concept for Neuschwanstein Castle
- 1870-1874: Assumption Church, Saint Paul, Minnesota, USA
