= Pathos Transport Theater =

Coordinates: 48°09′31″N 11°33′05″E

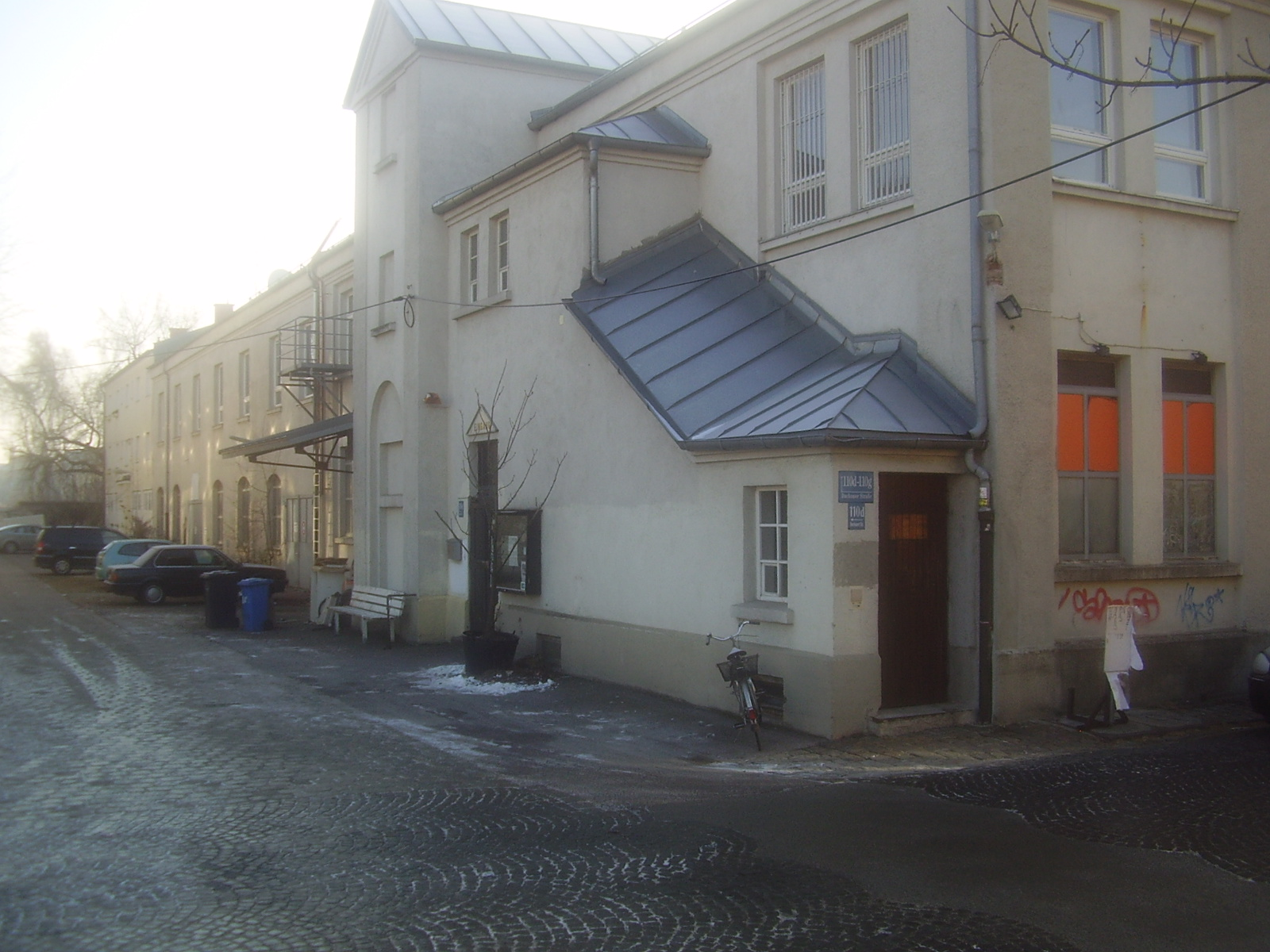
Pathos Transport Theater in the Dachauer Straße

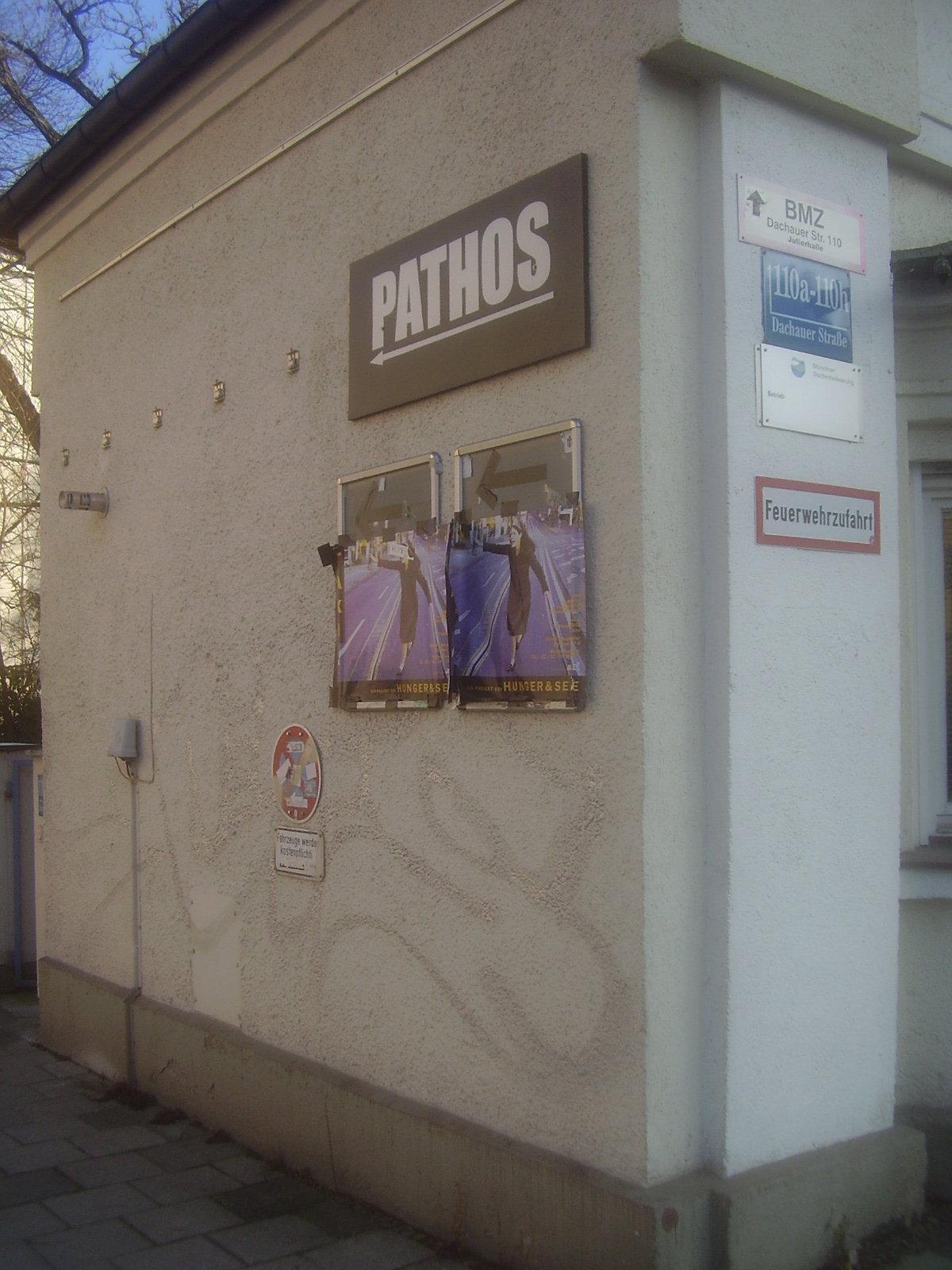
Pathos Transport Theater

Pathos Transport Theater, now known as Pathos München is a theatre in Munich, Bavaria, Germany. It was founded in 1982.
