= List of barracks in Munich =

The Bavarian capital Munich was home to many military barracks. The first ones were located near the historical center of Munich. At the end of the 18th century, a lot of military installations were built to the north of the historical center. Most of the installations were renamed during Nazi Germany, once more during the occupation of Germany after World War II when the installations were used by the United States Army, and once more when the Bundeswehr got them for use. Only three of them are currently used. The barracks of Munich are listed on a memorial stone which is located in Bayern-Kaserne.

== Former barracks ==
name	built in / closed in	other names	remarks
Kreuzkaserne	1670–1883		
Alte Isarkaserne	1700–1892		
Kosttor-Kaserne	1705–1855		
Max-Joseph-Kaserne	1804/1807–1899/1900	Infanterie-Leibregiment-Kaserne; Hofgartenkaserne	
Lehel-Kaserne	1806–1901		
Seidenhauskaserne	1808–1899/1900	Artillerie-Kaserne	
Neue Isarkaserne	1811–1902		
Türkenkaserne	1824–1945	Neue Infanteriekaserne am Türkengraben; Prinz-Arnulf-Kaserne	see also Türkentor
Salzstadelkaserne	1849–1890	Jägerkaserne	
Maximilian-II-Kaserne	1865–1945		
Marsfeldkaserne	1888–1945	Infanteriekaserne; "Einser"-Kaserne	
Eisenbahnkaserne	1890–1976	Kasernement des Eisenbahnbataillons (Bavarian army use)	
Oberwiesenfeldkaserne	1893–1969		
Luftschifferkaserne	1896–1999	Luitpoldkaserne	
Prinz-Leopold-Kaserne	1902–1945		
Telegraphenkaserne	1909/1910 –		
Kradschützen-Kaserne	1931–1994	Indiana Depot (U.S. Army use); Stetten-Kaserne (Bundeswehr use)	
Korpsnachrichten-Kaserne	1934–1994	Saar-Kaserne; Jensen Kaserne (U.S. Army use); Waldmann-Kaserne (Bundeswehr use)	
Funkkaserne	1936–1992		
Prinz-Eugen-Kaserne	1937–2009	Lohengrin-Kaserne (Nazi Germany); Peterson Kaserne (U.S. Army use)	
McGraw Kaserne	1945–1992		parts were used from the Reichszeugmeisterei (Nazi Germany)
Kronprinz-Rupprecht-Kaserne	1963–1994	Virginia Storage Area / Alabama Storage Area (U.S. Army use)	

== Existing barracks ==
name	built in / closed in	other names	remarks
Bayern-Kaserne	1935 –	General-Wever-Kaserne (Nazi Germany); Henry Kaserne (U.S. Army use)	sold in 2007
Fürst-Wrede-Kaserne	1936 –	Will Kaserne (U.S. Army use)	parts were sold in 2006
Ernst-von-Bergmann-Kaserne	1936 –	Kaserne "München-Freimann" (Nazi Germany); Warner Kaserne (U.S. Army use)	

== See also ==
- List of United States Army installations in Germany
