= Münchner Theater für Kinder =

Theatre in Munich, Bavaria, Germany

Coordinates: 48°08′46″N 11°33′34″E

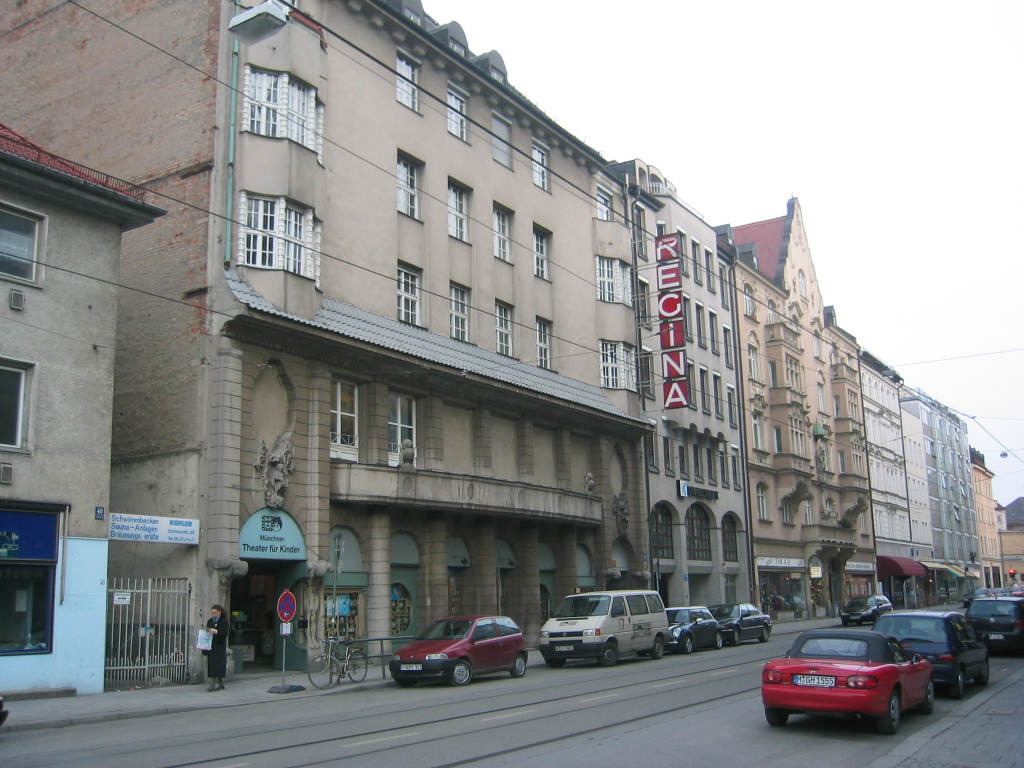
A picture of Münchner Theater für Kinder

Münchner Theater für Kinder is a theatre located in Munich, Bavaria, Germany.
