= Kleinkunstbühnen in München =

Theatre in Munich, Bavaria, Germany

Kleinkunstbühnen in München is a theatre in Munich, Bavaria, Germany.
