= Eisenbahnkaserne =

Coordinates: 48°9′50″N 11°32′34″E

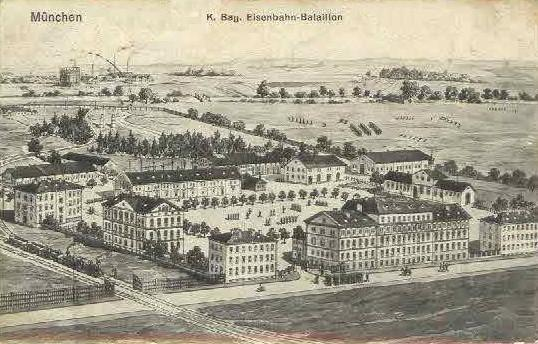
The barracks

The Eisenbahnkaserne ("Railway Barracks") was a military barracks in Munich that existed from 1890 to 1976. The "Kasernement des Eisenbahnbataillons" (Kasernement of the Railway Battalion) was built in 1888 and 1889. It was located west of today's Olympiapark on Dachauer Straße, where the Bundeswehr Administration Centre is now located.

== History ==
The facility was originally and mainly used by the Railway Battalion of the Bavarian Army, which was part of the I Royal Bavarian Corps, and was transferred from Ingolstadt to Munich in 1890. After World War II the barracks were used by the Bundeswehr.

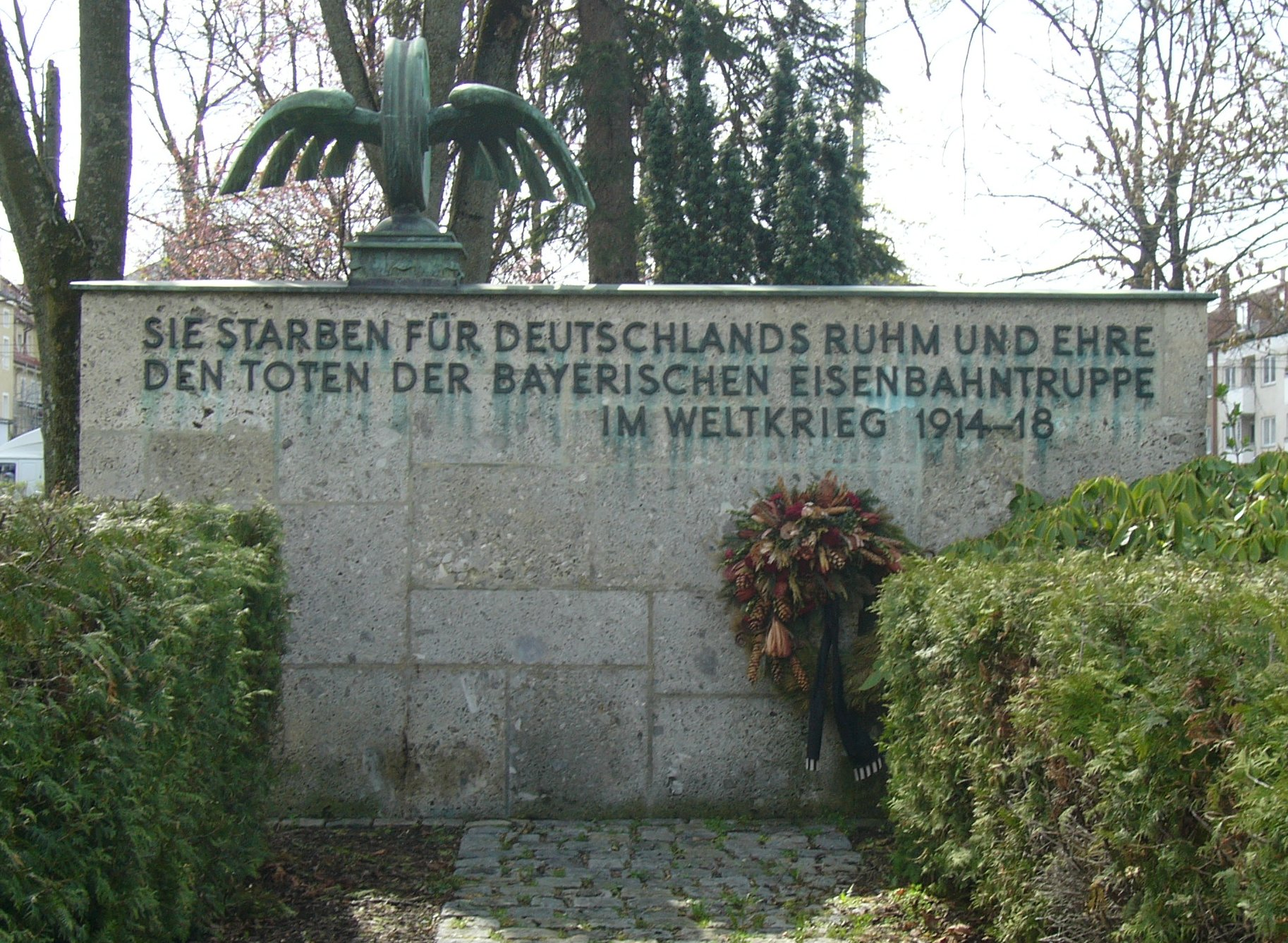
Monument: They died for Germany's fame and honour to the casualties of the Bavarian Railway Troops in the First World War, 1914–1918

At the beginning of the 1970s a part of the area was sold for the construction of the Olympiapark. Another part was torn down for the construction of the Rechenzentrum der Bundeswehr, (the Bundeswehr Computer Center), a canteen, and the administration office building of the Wehrbereichsverwaltung VI (Military District Administration VI), currently the Munich branch of the Wehrbereichsverwaltung South, Stuttgart. In the middle of the 1970s the southern part of the area was sold for the construction of residential buildings, and the former Wehrbereichskommando VI (Military District Command VI) moved from the Eisenbahnkaserne to the Waldmann-Kaserne.

A war memorial near Dachauer Straße commemorates the Bavarian railway troops of World War I. The original one was erected by Karl Badberger in 1922, but was destroyed in 1945 during World War II. It was rebuilt in 1965.

The remaining historical buildings north of Hedwig-Dransfeld-Allee are some of the few military structures in Munich that have survived from the 19th century. The main building has been rented by the Munich Studentenwerk since 2003 and was converted into a student housing building by architect, Christoph Maas, who had to meet the official historic preservation requirements. Maas was awarded the "Honour Award for Exemplary Redevelopment" by the city of Munich in 2005.

Current users of the area include the Munich branch of Military District Administration South, the Bundeswehr Medical Headquarters (since 2002), the Truppendienstgericht Süd (Military Court South), the Kreiswehrersatzamt Munich (District Recruiting Office Munich), the Bundeswehr Service Centre, Munich, a shop of the clothing company LH Bundeswehr Bekleidungsgesellschaft and the Bavarian association of the Technisches Hilfswerk.

== See also ==
- List of barracks in Munich
