= Luitpoldkaserne =

Coordinates: 48°9′37″N 11°33′7″E

names
founding name	Luftschifferkaserne
Bundeswehr name	Fürst-Wrede-Kaserne

The Luitpoldkaserne, originally Luftschifferkaserne, was a kaserne at Infanteriestraße 19 in Munich, Germany, which was built after 1896 to accommodate the air skippers unit of the Bavarian army, which was disposed in 1890.

== History ==
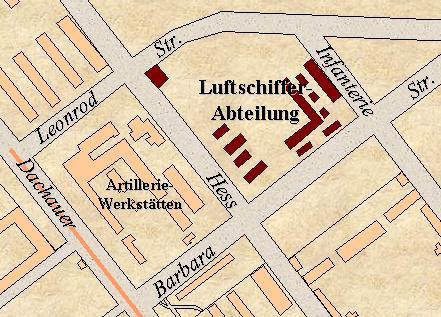
map of 1922

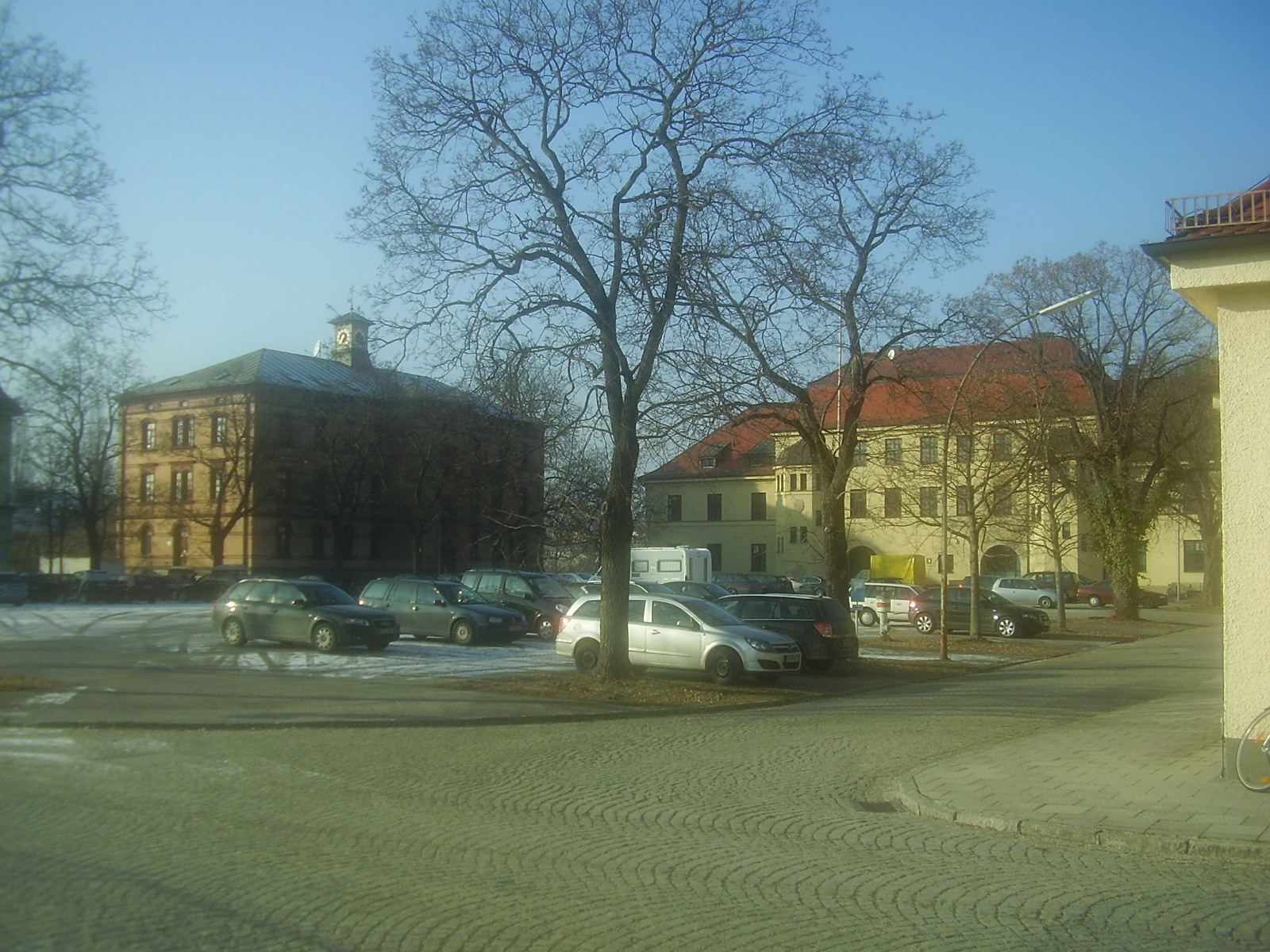
barrack yard of the former Luitpoldkaserne

The small barracks were built together with other military facilities in the North of the old town near the Oberwiesenfeld artillery training area in the end of the 19th century. In 1931/32 the facility was increased. After World War II the barracks were shortly used to house refugees from Eastern Europe, led by the International Refugee Organization and entrusted to the Russians. Those in charge were Russians who had fled Russia in the 1920s. It was rebuilt by the United States forces, housing refugees from Eastern Europe and were used afterwards by the Bundeswehr from 1955 until 1999. In 1957 the Sanitätstruppenschule des Heeres (Army Medical School, later Bundeswehr Medical School) moved to the barracks. In 1980 the follow-on institution moved to the Ernst-von-Bergmann-Kaserne. Other users were the Bundeswehrfachschule Munich, a professional school and predecessor of the Bundeswehrfachschule-/Zivile Aus- und Weiterbildungsbetreuungsstelle B München (BwFachS-/ZAW-BeSt B MCH), and the recruitment center of the Bundeswehr for the region of southern Germany.

In 1999 the facility was abandoned. While waiting for a decision of further use, most of the buildings were rented to civilian companies. The Bundeswehrfachschule stood in the Luitpold-Kaserne until 2005, when it moved to a rented object at Edmund-Rumpler-Straße 9. In 2004 the city of Munich bought the area, and plans to cover it with residential and commercial buildings at long sight. A plan for a housing area initiated by the Deutscher Werkbund was declined by the city.
