= List of educational institutions in Faridabad =

The city of Faridabad has a number of education facilities.

== Colleges ==
- J.C. Bose University of Science and Technology, YMCA
- Manav Rachna University
- National Institute of Animal Welfare
- Rai Foundation Engineering College

== Schools ==
- Delhi Public School, Sector 19, Faridabad
- Faridabad Model School, Sector 31, Faridabad
- Holy Child Public School, Sector 29, Faridabad
- Jawahar Navodaya Vidyalaya, Mothuka
- The Modern School, BPTP Parklands, Sector 85, Faridabad
- Modern Vidya Niketan schools
- SOS Hermann Gmeiner School, Sector 29, Faridabad
- Vidya Sanskar International School, Bhopani

== See also ==
- List of institutions of higher education in Haryana
