= Eicher =

Eicher may refer to:

- Eicher (surname), a surname
- Eicher Motors (Eicher Group)
- Eicher tractor
- Eicher School, a school in the Faridabad district in the state of Haryana, India
- 3617 Eicher, a main-belt asteroid

== See also ==
- Aicher
- Aich (disambiguation)
- Eich (disambiguation)
