= Eicker =

Eicker is a surname. Notable people with the surname include:

- Edward Eicker (born 1975), American composer
- Friedhelm Eicker (1927–2022), German statistician and former professor at the University of Dortmund

== See also ==
- Ecker (surname)
- Eicher (surname)
- Ricker
