= Aichinger =

Aichinger is a surname. Notable people with the surname include:

- Gregor Aichinger (1564–1628), German composer
- Ilse Aichinger (1921–2016), Austrian writer
- Oskar Aichinger (born 1956), Austrian jazz pianist
- Utz Aichinger (1938–2023), West German field hockey player

== See also ==
- Eichinger
- Aich (disambiguation)
- Aicher
