= Automotive industry in Bangladesh =

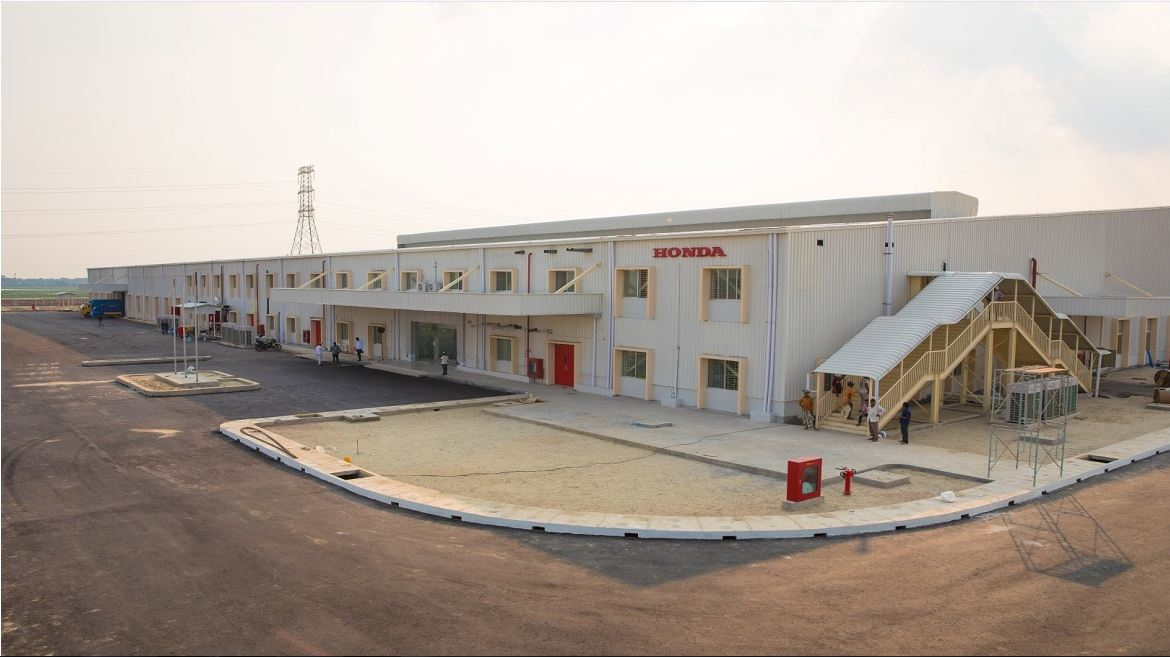
Manufacturing Plant of Honda Two Wheelers in Bangladesh

The automotive industry in Bangladesh is the third largest in South Asia.

Bangladesh has a few large car plants which assemble passenger cars from Mitsubishi and Toyota, as well as commercial vehicles from Hino and Tata.

Motorcycles, auto rickshaws and the locally designed Mishuk three-wheeler are manufactured in Bangladesh.

As of January 2024, there are 410,532 private passenger car, 121,387 microbus, 4.34 million motorcycle and a total of almost 6 million vehicles including the ones already stated.

== History ==
=== Four wheelers ===
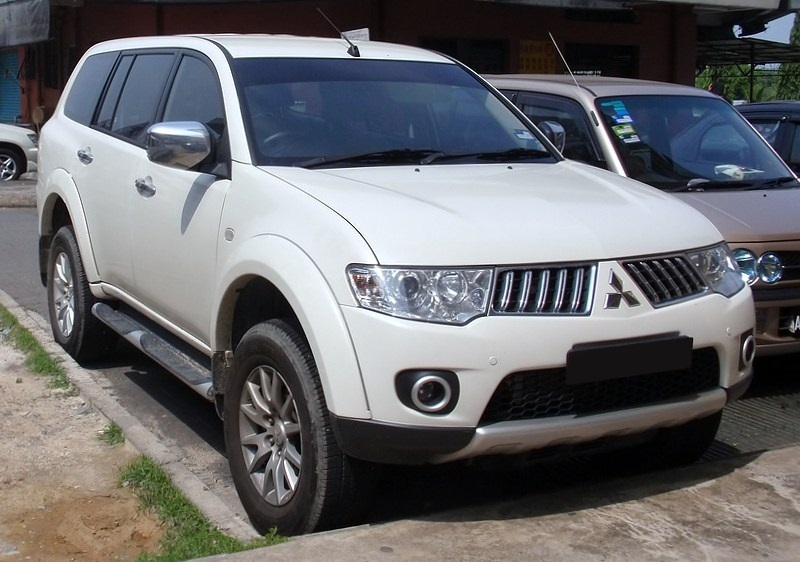
Pragoti is producing the Mitsubishi Pajero Sport in Bangladesh.

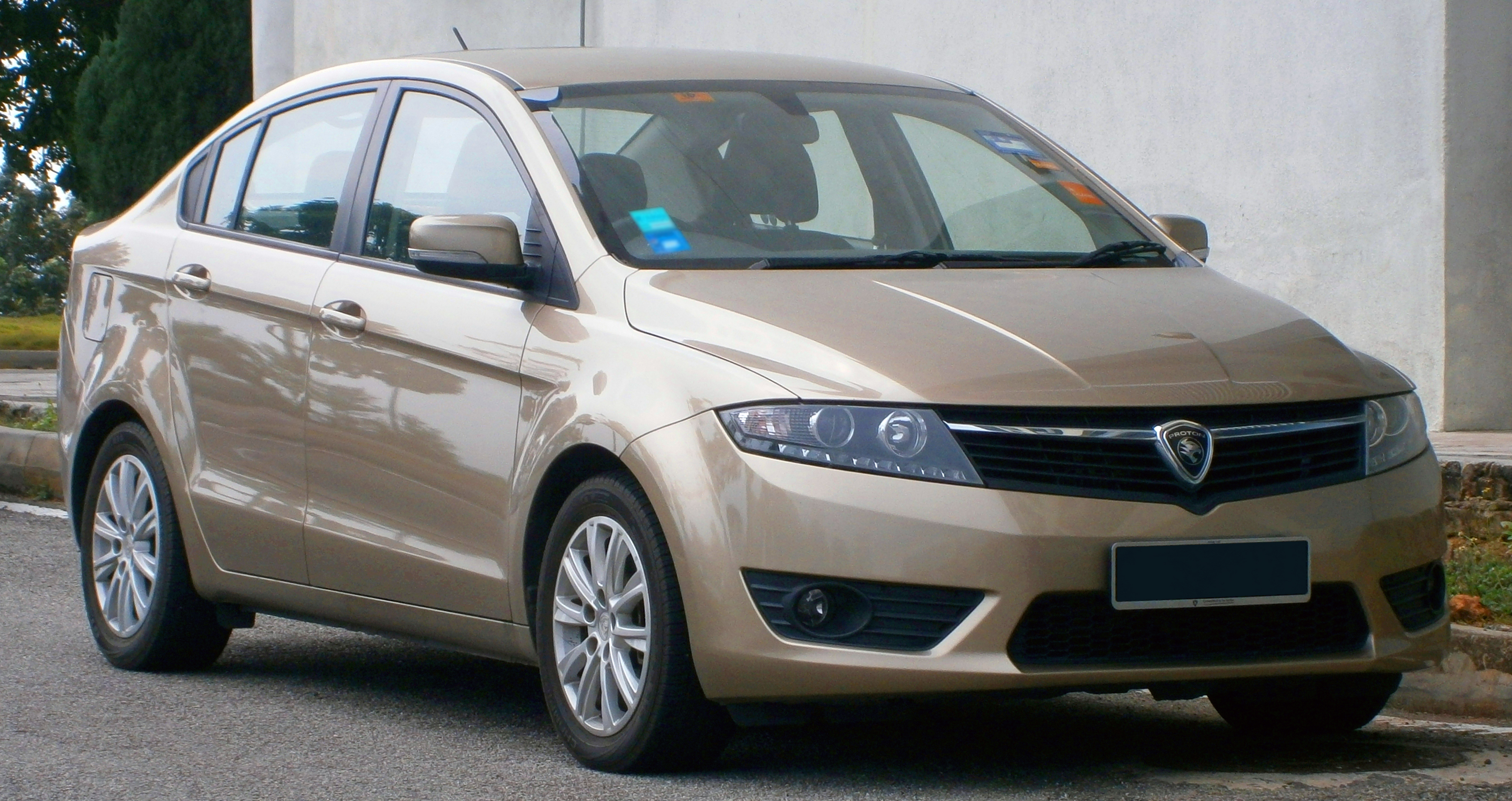
PHP Automobiles commenced assembly of Proton cars in 2017.

Pragoti Industries Limited (PIL) is among the oldest and largest automobile assemblers in Bangladesh. The company has assembled over 50,000 vehicles since its inception in 1966. In February 2010, Japanese car manufacturer Mitsubishi officially proposed to the Bangladesh government to locally assemble the Mitsubishi Pajero Sport in collaboration with Pragoti. Operations commenced in August 2011, with an annual production output of around 500 units.

In 2009, the Malaysian Agate Group proposed establishing an automobile manufacturing plant in Bangladesh in cooperation with Walton, which was then preparing to venture into motorcycle production. That same year, Russian automaker, TagAZ announced plans to build its third factory in Bangladesh for export pursposes, with completion scheduled for 2012. However, the project was abandoned after the company filed for bankruptcy.

In March 2015, PHP Group and Proton announced a partnership to assemble Proton vehicles in Bangladesh, investing Tk 400 crore to construct a new assembly plant in Chittagong with an annual production capacity of 1,200 units. In May 2017, PHP Automobiles officially launched the Bangladeshi-built Proton Prevé. The company intended to market the Prevé as an alternative to used imported cars that dominated the local market.

In August 2018, Foton Motor, a Chinese vehicle manufacturer, announced to set up a plant in Bangladesh by next year to assemble commercial vehicles in a joint venture with ACI Motors

In May 2019, Japanese automaker giant Mitsubishi Motors decided to invest $100 million in Bangladesh to produce its branded vehicles. The company will invest the sum at the Mirsarai Economic Zone in Chittagong, initially for assembling cars and will gradually upgrade the assembly plant to a full car manufacturing plant.

In February 2023, South Korean automaker Hyundai has set up car manufacturing factory on two industrial plots at the Bangabandhu Hi-Tech Park in Kaliakoir of Gazipur with collaboration from Fair Technology. The factory has already manufactured 100 Hyundai Creta, a very popular subcompact crossover SUV in Bangladesh. Each Hyundai Creta was assembled using more than 1000 components sourced from many different countries. At first, the factory has planned to manufacture 3000 Hyundai Creta SUVs every year, however, it has plans to increase 10,000 units per year gradually.

=== Motorcycles and scooters ===
Bangladesh started manufacturing of motorcycles in 2000's. Walton made the first production of motorcycles in the country. Runner Automobiles was the second company to manufacture motorcycles in Bangladesh which was started in 2012. After then many other local companies got engaged in producing of motorcycles. Some local companies like RoadMaster Motors, Jamuna Automobiles are few of them.

In 2014, Hero MotoCorp made a re-enter in Bangladesh market with the hands of local Nitol-Niloy Group and expressed their interests to set up a manufacturing plant in couple of years. In 2017, Hero MotoCorp launched their motorcycle manufacturing plant in a joint venture with their local partner Niloy Motors (A subsidiary of Nitol-Niloy Group).

In 2016, Runner Automobiles signed a collaboration agreement with UM Motorcycles to manufacture UM motorcycles in Bangladesh under the name of UM-Runner . The motorcycles will be manufactured at Runner's motorcycle manufacturing facilities at Bhaluka while UM International LLC will provide R&D support in technological & engineering fields as well as global component sourcing. Bangladeshi manufactured UM-Runner motorcycles entered the market in the second quadrant of 2018.

.

In September 2012, A joint venture deal was signed between Honda and Bangladesh Steel and Engineering Corporation to form Honda's first Bangladeshi subsidiary Bangladesh Honda Private Limited (BHL) . Honda has 70% stake in the joint venture. After then, Honda committed to set up a motorcycle manufacturing plant in the country. In November 2017, Honda made a groundbreaking ceremony to mark the start of construction of their motorcycle manufacturing plant in Munshiganj District, Dhaka Division in Bangladesh. In November 2018, Honda launched their first motorcycle manufacturing plant in Munshiganj.

On 11 May 2019, ACI Motors Limited, the only distributor of Yamaha Motorcycles in Bangladesh, inaugurated Yamaha Motorcycle CKD Assembly Factory at Borochala, Sreepur, Gazipur with annual production capacity of 60,000 units. Yamaha Motorcycle CKD Assembly Factory was established by the direct collaboration of Yamaha Japan and the necessary equipment and technical supports are supplied by Yamaha Japan to ensure the quality in every stage of manufacturing. Two models will be assembled at the plant at first and manufacturing of motorcycles will start from 2020.

== Automobile companies in Bangladesh ==
- ACI Motors (Yamaha, Foton, Kobelco, Case)
- Akij Motors
- Aftab Automobiles (Navana Group)
- Bangladesh Auto Industries Limited (BAIL)
- Bangladesh Honda Private Limited (a subsidiary of Honda)
- Bangladesh Machine Tools Factory (BMTF)
- Fair Technology Limited (Hyundai)
- Ifad Autos PLC (Ashok Leyland)
- Ifad Motors Ltd (Royal Enfield)
- Jamuna Automobiles
- Nitol Motors (Tata Motors)
- Niloy-Hero Motors (joint venture between Hero MotoCorp and Niloy Motors)
- Palki Motors Limited
- Pragoti
- PHP Automobiles (Proton)
- Karnaphuli Wheels (Renault Bangladesh)
- Roadmaster Motors Limited
- Runner Automobiles PLC (Runner Motorcycle, KTM, Aprilia, Vespa, Bajaj CNG)
- Runner Motors PLC (Eicher)
- CG Runner BD Ltd (BYD)
- Rancon Motor Bikes Ltd (Suzuki Motorcycle)
- Rancon Motors (Mercedes-Benz, MG Motor, Mitsubishi Motors, Fuso)
- Uttara Motors (Suzuki cars, Bajaj Auto, Isuzu)
- Walton Motors
- Meghna Automobiles Ltd. (Kia)
