= Sabanov =

Sabanov is a Russian surname. Notable people with the surname include:

- Erol Sabanov (born 1974), Bulgarian-German football goalkeeper
- Ivan Sabanov (born 1992), Serbian tennis player
- Matej Sabanov (born 1992), Serbian tennis player
