= Ickes =

Ickes is a surname and may refer to:

- Harold Ickes (disambiguation), multiple people, including:
  - Harold L. Ickes (1874–1952), U.S. Secretary of the Interior in Franklin D. Roosevelt's administration
  - Harold M. Ickes (born 1939), American deputy White House Chief of Staff during Bill Clinton's administration
- Anna Wilmarth Ickes (1873–1935), American activist, politician
- Rob Ickes, American dobro (resonator guitar) player.
- William Ickes, professor of psychology at the University of Texas at Arlington

== See also ==
- Ickes Mountains, Antarctica
- Icke
