= Shrimp plant =

Shrimp plant can refer to two plants in Acanthaceae:

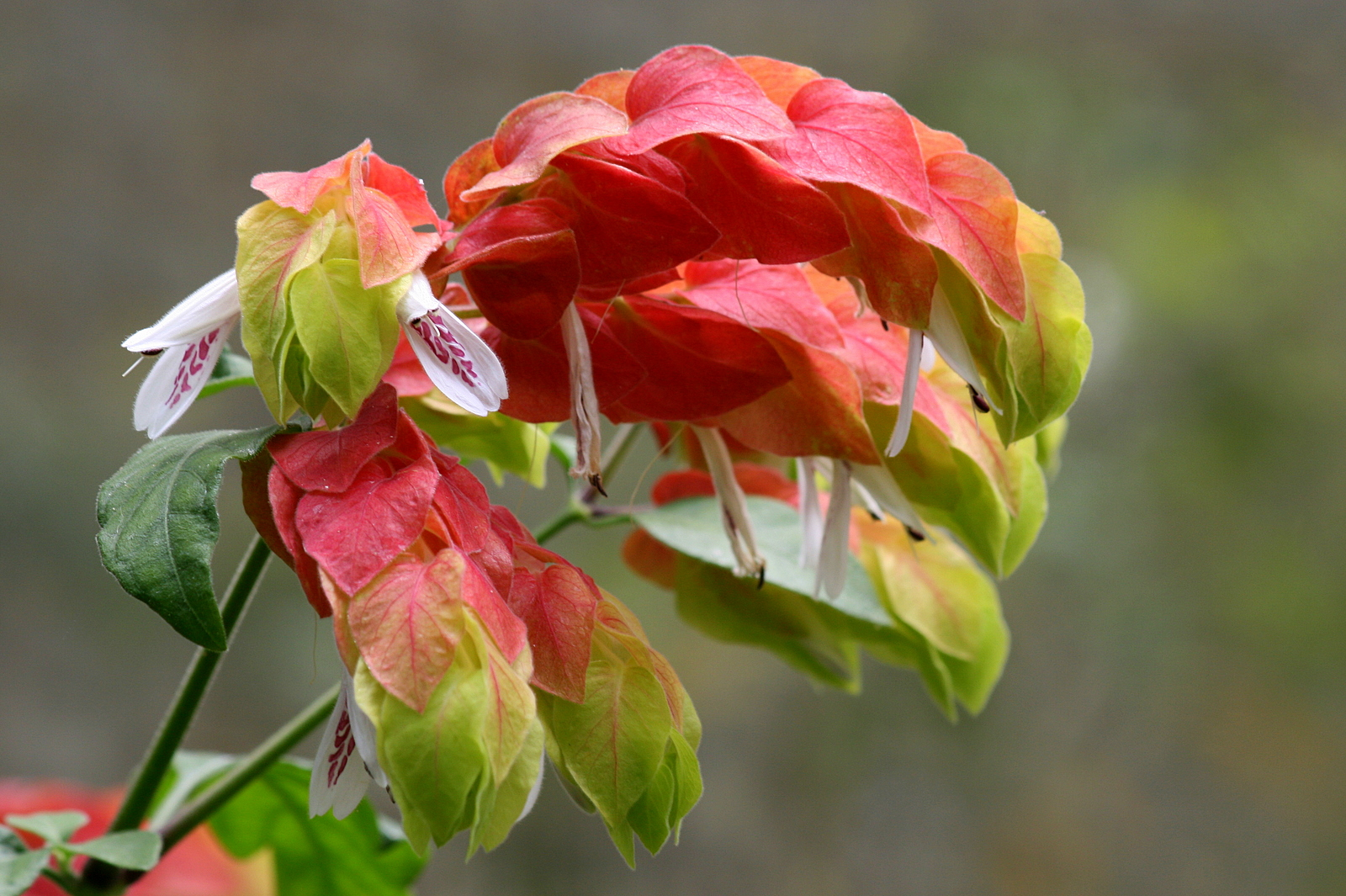
Justicia brandegeeana, which has salmon-colored bracts and 3 to 7.5 cm long elliptic leaves

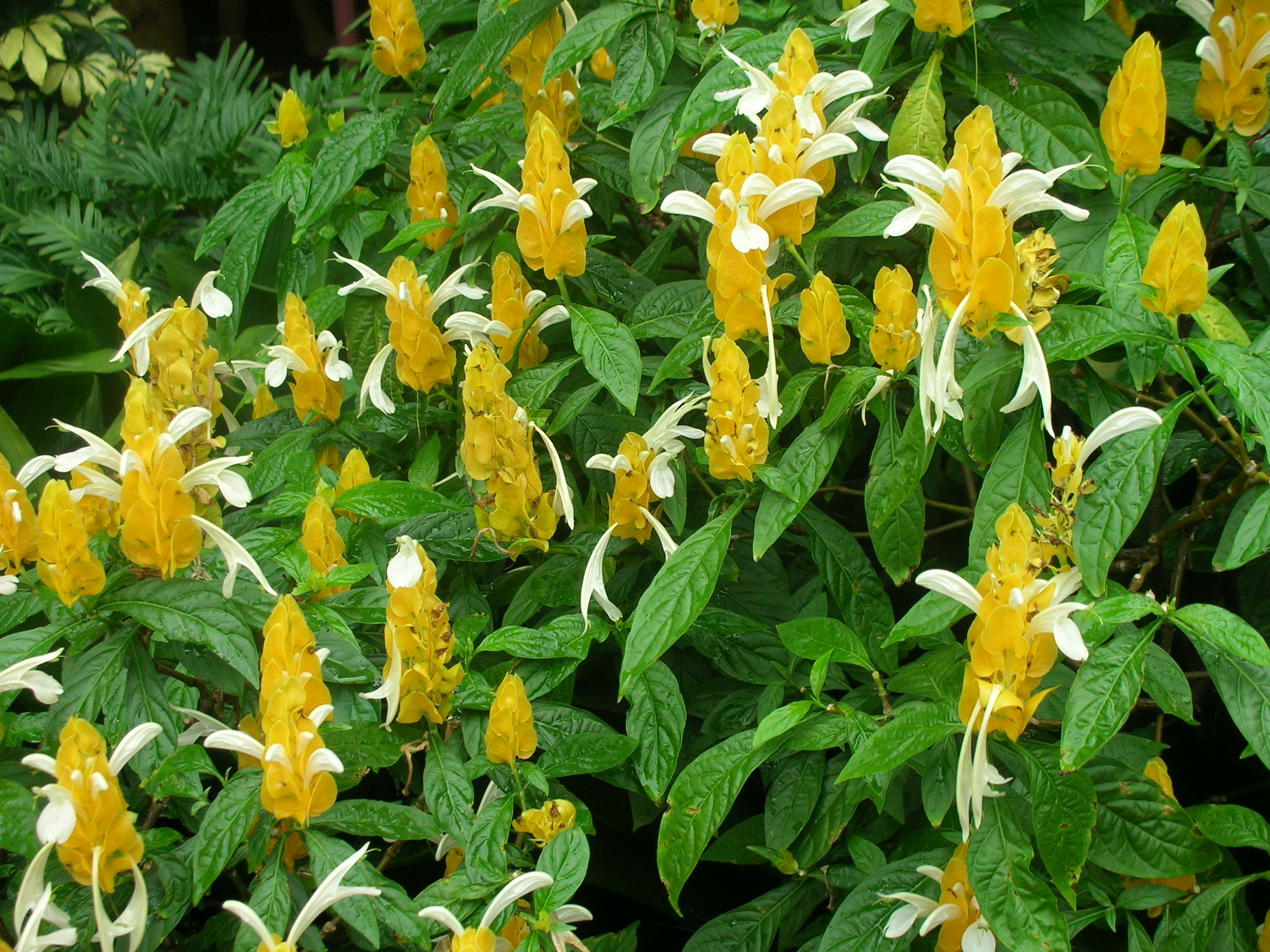
Pachystachys lutea, which has yellow bracts and 15 cm long lanceolate leaves
