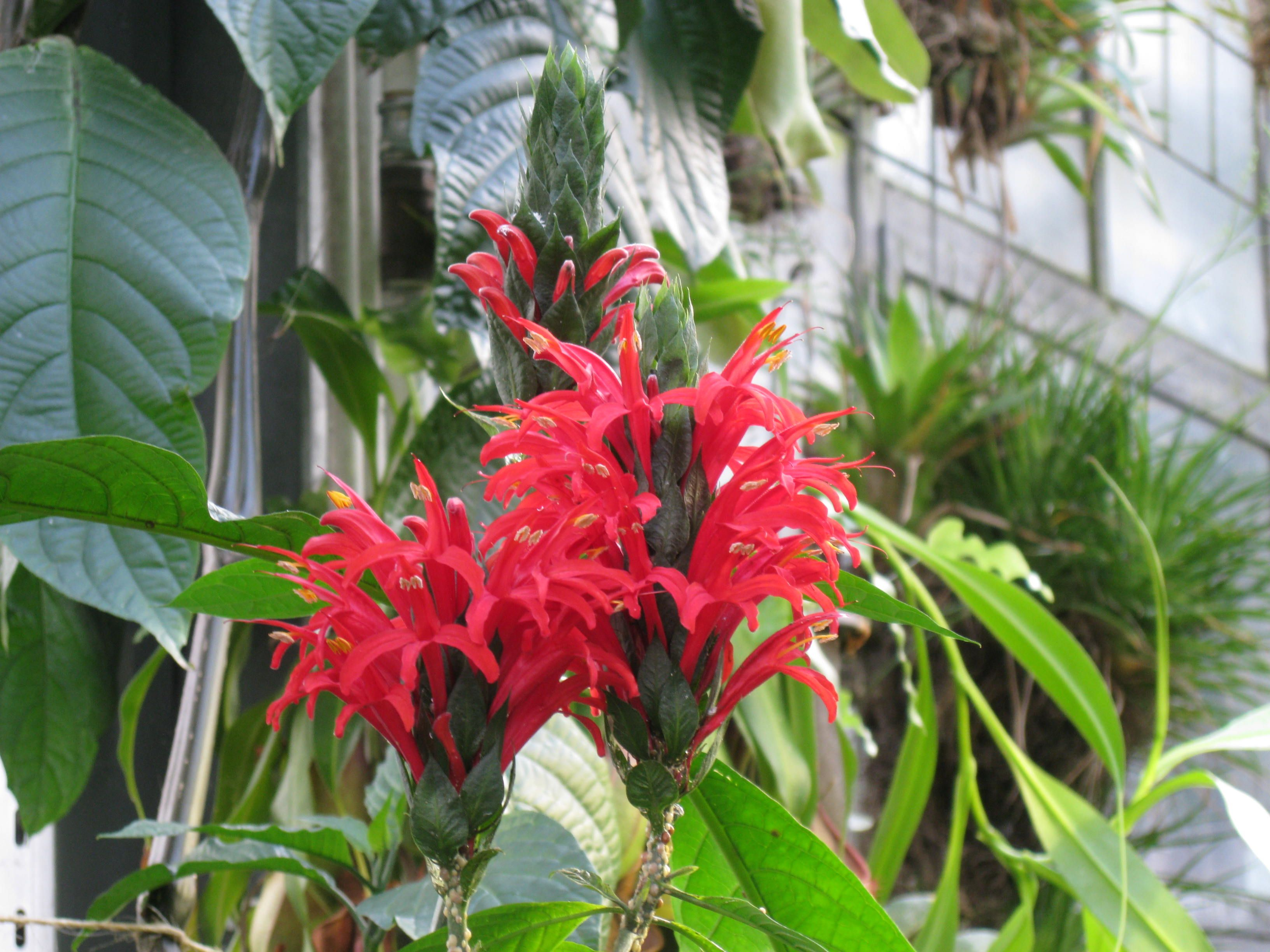
- P. spicata, Oldenburg Botanic Gardens, Germany

Scientific classification
- Kingdom: Plantae
- Clade: Tracheophytes
- Clade: Angiosperms
- Clade: Eudicots
- Clade: Asterids
- Order: Lamiales
- Family: Acanthaceae
- Tribe: Justicieae
- Genus: Pachystachys; Nees (1847)

Species
- 18, see text

= Pachystachys =

Genus of flowering plants

Pachystachys is a genus of 12 species of flowering plants in the family Acanthaceae, native to rainforest in the Caribbean and Central and South America. They are evergreen perennials and shrubs bearing prominent terminal spikes of flowers with brightly coloured bracts.

The name Pachystachys comes from the Greek for "thick spike", referring to the flower heads. The genus is closely related to Justicia.

The species P. coccinea, P. lutea and P. spicata are found in cultivation. They can be grown outside in subtropical gardens in areas where the temperature does not fall below 10 °C (50 °F). Elsewhere, they can be grown under glass or as houseplants.

== Species ==
18 species are accepted.

- Pachystachys azaleiflora (Rusby) A.L.A.Côrtes
- Pachystachys badiospica Wassh.
- Pachystachys coccinea (Aubl.) Nees
- Pachystachys cordata (Nees) A.L.A.Côrtes
- Pachystachys dubiosa (Lindau) A.L.A.Côrtes
- Pachystachys fosteri Wassh.
- Pachystachys gracilis A.L.A.Côrtes
- Pachystachys incarnata Wassh.
- Pachystachys killipii Wassh.
- Pachystachys linearibracteata A.L.A.Côrtes
- Pachystachys longibracteata Wassh.
- Pachystachys lutea Nees
- Pachystachys ossolae Wassh.
- Pachystachys puberula Wassh.
- Pachystachys rosea Wassh.
- Pachystachys schunkei Wassh.
- Pachystachys spicata Ruiz & Pav.) Wassh.
- Pachystachys velutina (W.Bull) A.L.A.Côrtes
