= Eichinger =

Eichinger is a German family name:

- Bernd Eichinger (1949-2011), German film producer
- Gabriella Eichinger Ferro-Luzzi, Italian anthropologist and dravidologist
- Hans Eichinger, an Austrian bobsledder
- Julia Eichinger (born 1992), German freestyle skier
- Katja Eichinger (born 1971), German author and film producer
- Martin Eichinger (born 1949), an American sculptor
- Nina Eichinger (born 1981, Munich), a German TV presenter and actress
- Noel Eichinger (born 2001), German footballer
- Stefan Eichinger (born 1994), composer and disc jockey

== See also ==
- Aichinger (Austro-Bavarian form)
- Bernd-Eichinger-Platz, a square in the Munich district of Maxvorstadt
