= Gabelsbergerstraße =

Street in Munich

Coordinates: 48.1485°N 11.5649°E

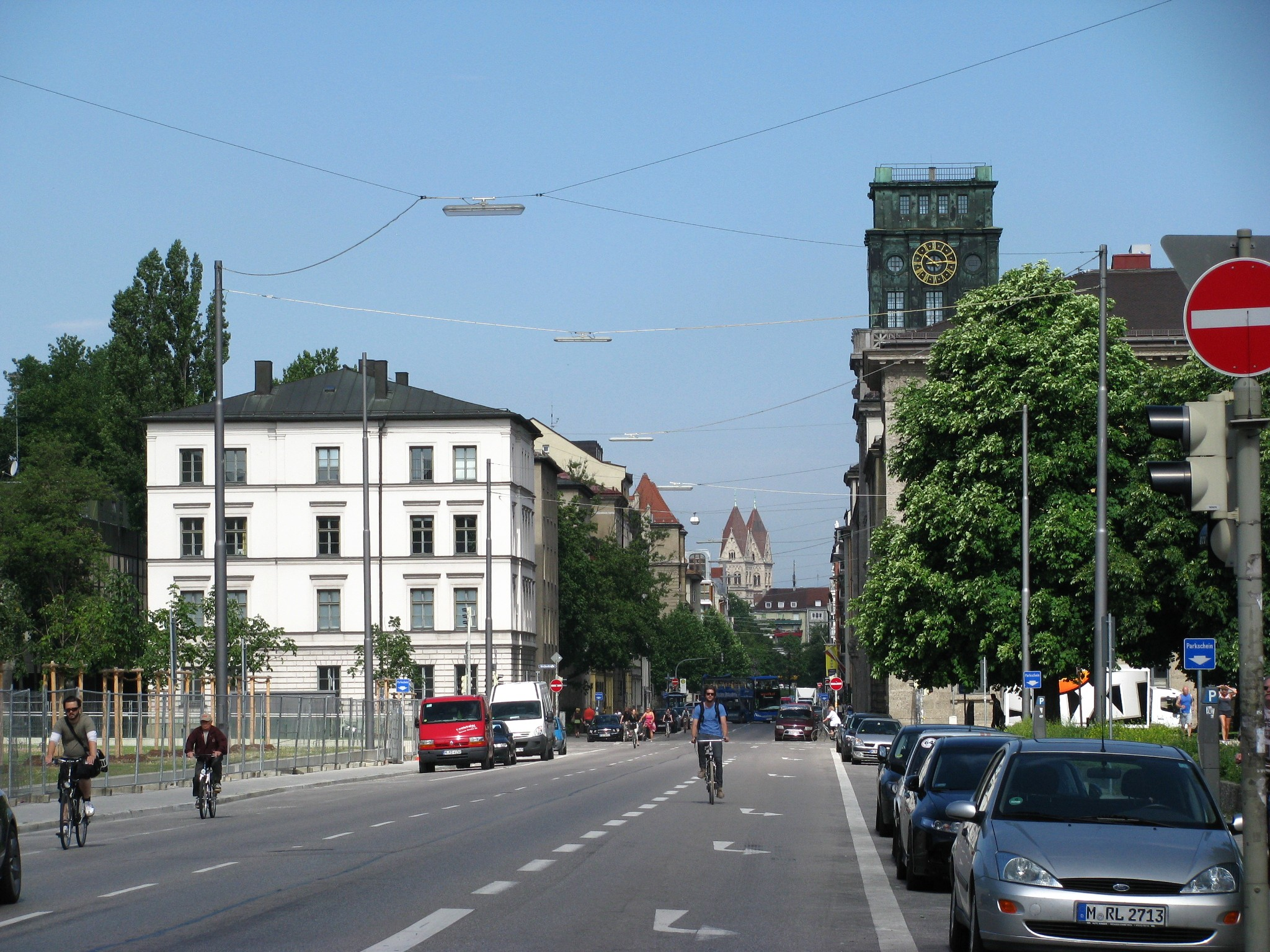
View to the west at the TUM

Gabelsbergerstraße is a city centre street in the Munich district of Maxvorstadt. It leads from Oskar-von-Miller-Ring in a north-western direction to Dachauer Straße, where it becomes Josef-Ruederer-Straße. Over its entire length it is a one-way street with the direction of travel from west to east.

Gabelsbergerstraße 6 is home to the Protestant Church of St. Markus, Gabelsbergerstraße 33-35 is home to the Staatliche Sammlung für Ägyptische Kunst (State Museum of Egyptian Art) and the University of Television and Film Munich with the Bernd-Eichinger-Platz. On Gabelsbergerstraße you will find the Kunstareal München and the main campus of the Technical University of Munich.

The buildings in Gabelsbergerstraße 6, 9, 11/13/15, 17, 19, 36, 38, 40, 45/47, 49, 51, 53, 68, 70, 71, 79a, 81, 83, 89, 91 and 95 are architectural historical monuments.

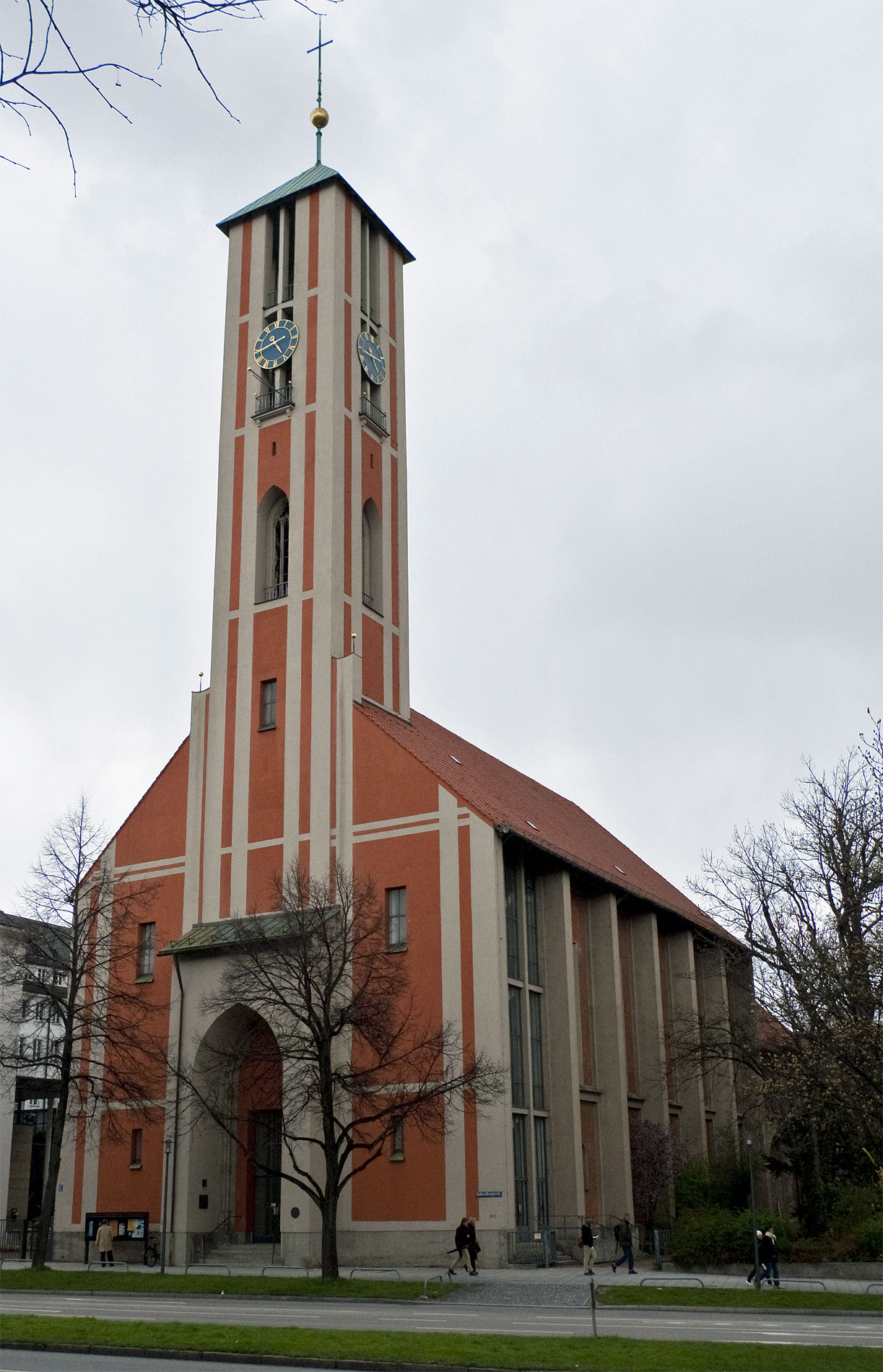
6, St. Markus

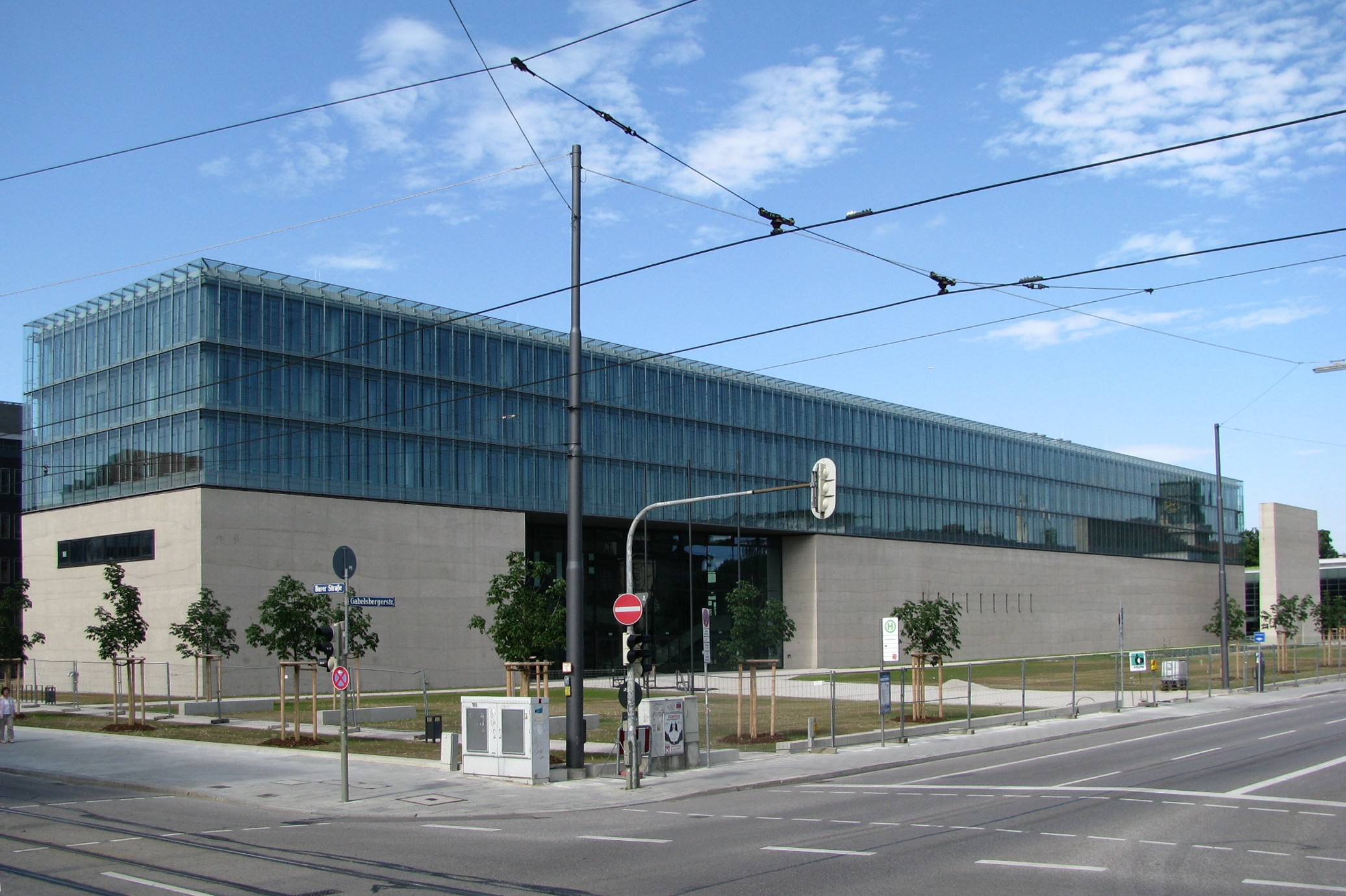
33-35, Staatliche Sammlung für Ägyptische Kunst and University of Television and Film Munich

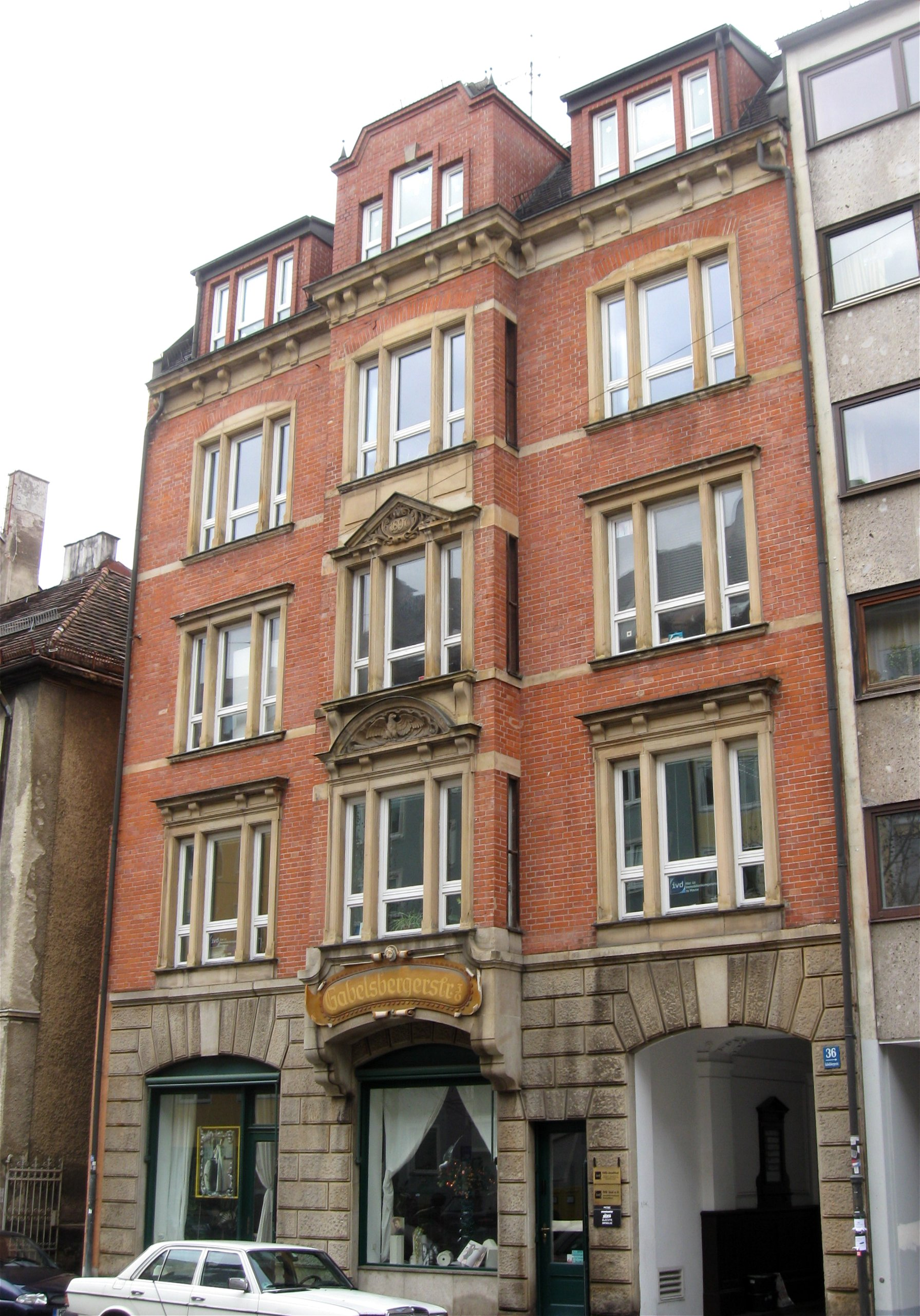
36

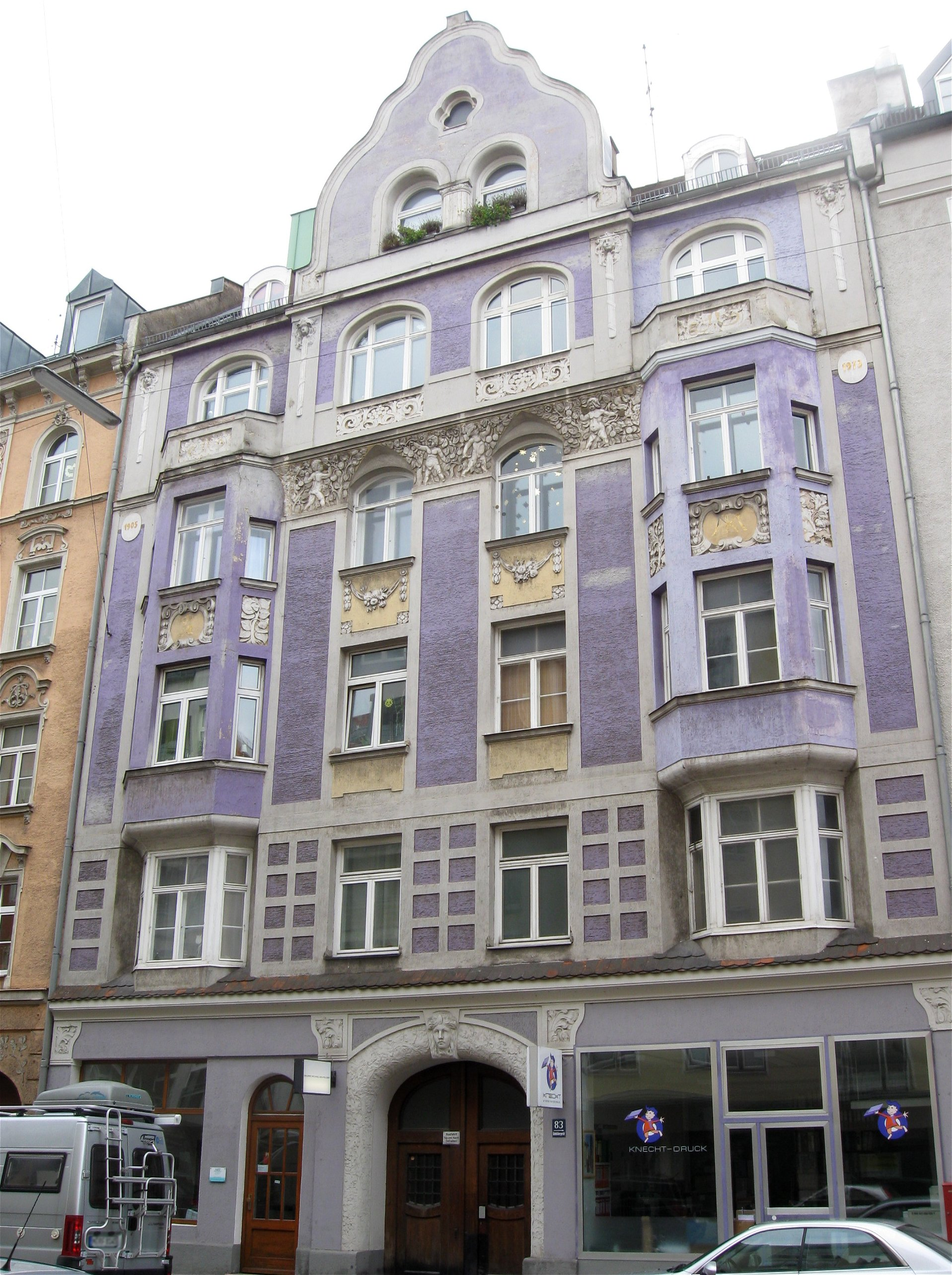
83

== History ==
The Türkenkaserne (Turkish Barracks) was located on Gabelsbergerstraße until its destruction in the Second World War.

Following a proposal by the city council in 1861, King Maximilian II approved the renaming of Kasernstraße to Gabelsbergerstraße after the inventor of shorthand, Franz Xaver Gabelsberger. Until his death in 1849 he lived in the house Kasernstraße 6 on the first floor. The name of the street has been official since 1862.

The lawyer Otto von Kühlmann and the artist Heinrich Höfer also lived on Gabelsbergerstraße.

In 1977, the Hinterhoftheater (predecessor of the Wirtshaus am Hart) was founded on Gabelsbergerstraße 50 and was located there until mid-1980.
