= Eich =

Eich may refer to:

== Places ==
- Eich, Rhineland-Palatinate, Germany
- Eich (Verbandsgemeinde), a collective municipality in Alzey-Worms, Rhineland-Palatinate, Germany
- Eich, Switzerland
- Eich, Luxembourg

== People ==
- Eich (surname), a list of people with this surname
- Ray Eichenlaub (1892/1893 – 1949), American gridiron football player, nicknamed "Eich" or "Iron Eich"

== See also ==
- Aich (disambiguation)
- Eiche (disambiguation)
- Ike (disambiguation)
