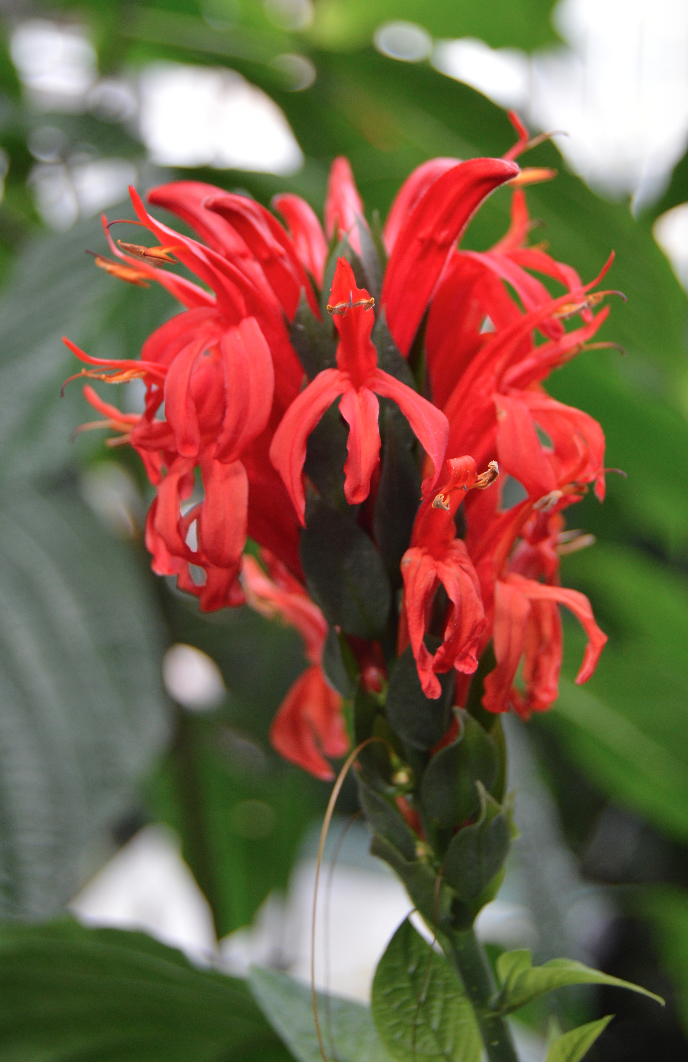
- Pachystachys coccinea at the United States Botanic Garden

Scientific classification
- Kingdom: Plantae
- Clade: Tracheophytes
- Clade: Angiosperms
- Clade: Eudicots
- Clade: Asterids
- Order: Lamiales
- Family: Acanthaceae
- Genus: Pachystachys
- Species: P. coccinea

Binomial name
- Pachystachys coccinea Nees

Synonyms
- Justicia coccinea; Jacobinia coccinea

= Pachystachys coccinea =

Species of plant

Pachystachys coccinea, the Cardinals guard, is a perennial evergreen shrub native to French Guiana, Brazil, and Peru. It has ovate to elliptic dark leaves and red flowers on terminal spikes, and can grow to be two to six feet tall, though cultivated plants tend to be shorter.

The genus name Pachystachys is derived from the Greek for thick spike in reference to the flowering spikes. The species name coccinea is derived from the Latin for scarlet in reference to the deep red flowers.
