= Aicher =

Aicher is a surname. Notable people with the surname include:

- Anton Aicher (1859–1930), Austrian artistic theatre director
- Emma Aicher (born 2003), German-Swedish alpine skier
- Gretl Aicher (1928–2012), Austrian artistic theatre director
- Otl Aicher (1922–1991), German graphic designer and typographer

== See also ==
- Eicher (disambiguation)
- Aich (disambiguation)
- Maximilian Aichern (1932–2026), Austrian Roman Catholic bishop
