= Eich (surname) =

Eich is a German surname. Notable people with the surname include:

- Brendan Eich (born 1961), American computer programmer
- Carsten Eich (born 1970), German runner
- Daniel Eich (born 2000), Swiss judoka
- Günter Eich (1907–1972), German author
- Hans Eich (born 1949), West German sprint canoeist
- Marina Anna Eich (born 1976), German actress
- Peter Eich (born 1963), German footballer
- Walter Eich (1925–2018), Swiss footballer
- William Eich, American judge

== See also ==
- Icke
