= Aich (surname) =

Aich (Bengali: আইচ) also spelled as Aitch, is a Bengali Hindu surname belonging to the Maulika Kayastha sub-caste of Bengali Kayastha caste as well as some other Bengali castes.

== Notable people with this surname ==
- Manohar Aich (1912–2016), Indian bodybuilder
- Prodosh Aich (born 1933), retired Bengali-Indian professor and author
