= University of Oldenburg =

German university

Carl von Ossietzky University of Oldenburg
- Carl von Ossietzky Universität Oldenburg
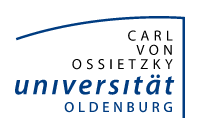
- Motto: Offen für neue Wege
- Motto in English: Open for new ways
- Type: Public
- Established: 1973
- Affiliations: EUA
- Budget: €224.3 million
- President: Ralph Bruder
- Academic staff: 1,459
- Administrative staff: 1,037
- Students: 15,220
- Location: Oldenburg, Lower Saxony, Germany; 53°08′52″N 8°10′56″E
- Campus: Urban
- Website: uni-oldenburg.de

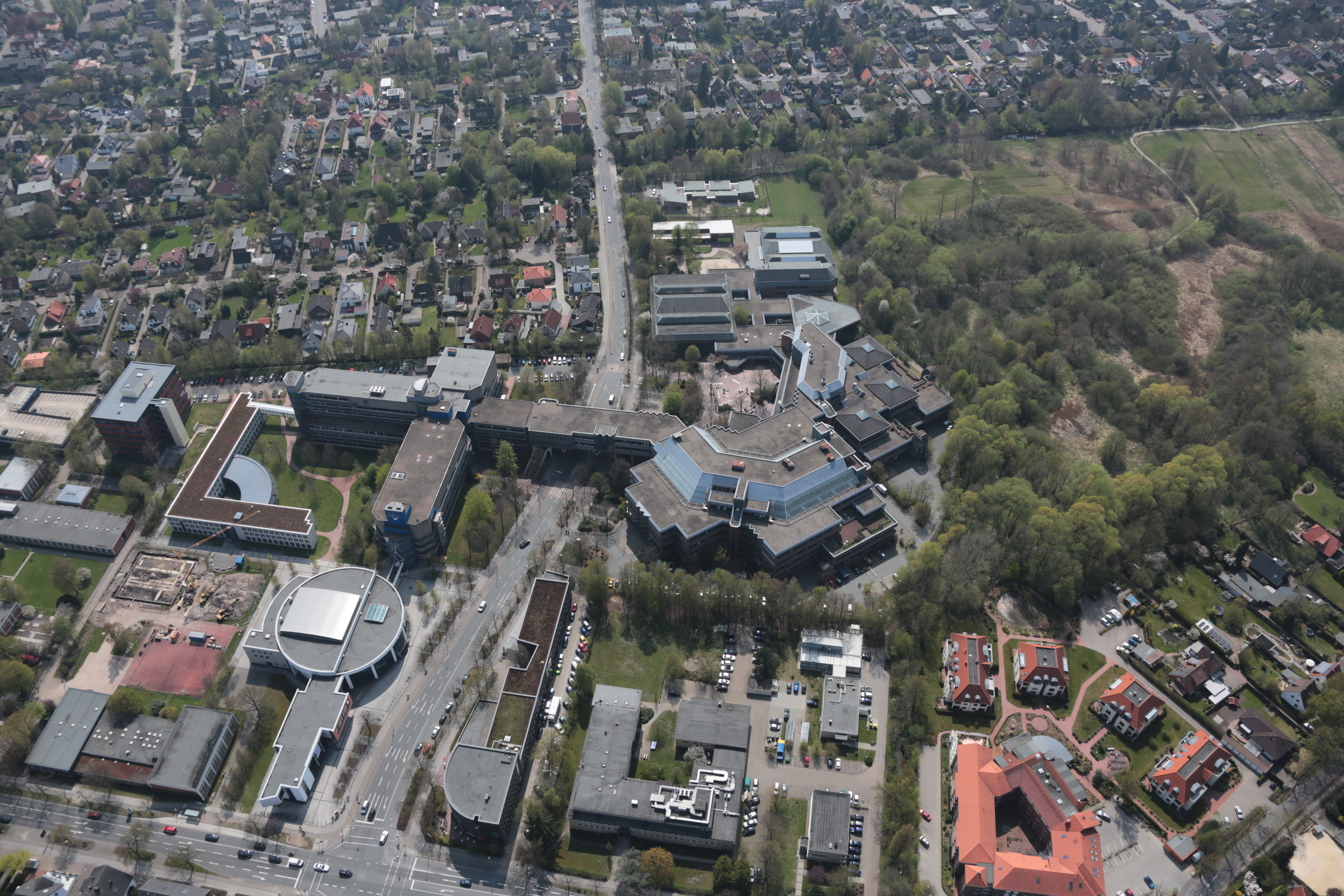
Aerial view of the Carl von Ossietzky Universität Oldenburg

The Carl von Ossietzky University of Oldenburg (German: Carl von Ossietzky Universität Oldenburg) is a university in Oldenburg, Germany.

German pronunciation

== History ==
The first teachers training was held in Oldenburg as early as 1793, launched by Duke Peter Friedrich Ludwig. A garden seminar for teachers training was created in 1882. During the Weimar Republic, the establishment of the Pedagogical Academy (Pädagogische Akademie) in Oldenburg in 1929 enabled the vocational training of teachers. On 1 October 1945, the institution reopened in postwar Germany. In 1948 it was renamed the Pedagogical College Oldenburg (Pädagogische Hochschule Oldenburg).

The first step towards the university was taken on 23 February 1959 with the decision of the city council to launch a university project, which was followed in 1970 with the Memorandum establishing the University of Oldenburg from the Minister of Culture of Lower Saxony. The Landtag of Lower Saxony decided to integrat the former Pedagogig Seminar (Pädagogische Hochschule) into the university. The university was finally founded in 1973. Enrollment and teaching started in the summer semester of 1974, with an education curriculum for 2,400 students in eight diploma courses. In 1991, the university was officially named after pacifist, writer and Nobel laureate Carl von Ossietzky, having been denied to take on his name by previous (both left-leaning and right-leaning) state governments. That same year, the number of students passed the mark of 10,000. The eleven departments of the university were reorganized into five faculties in 2002. By the end of 2011, there were about 11,325 students.

In 2012, the university founded the faculty of medicine and health sciences, introducing a 12-semester course in human medicine, which leads up to the German state examination, Staatsexamen, a prerequisite to practice as a physician. The new faculty is part of the European Medical School Oldenburg-Groningen (EMS), a cooperation between the University of Oldenburg, the University of Groningen (Netherlands), and local hospitals.

== University profile ==
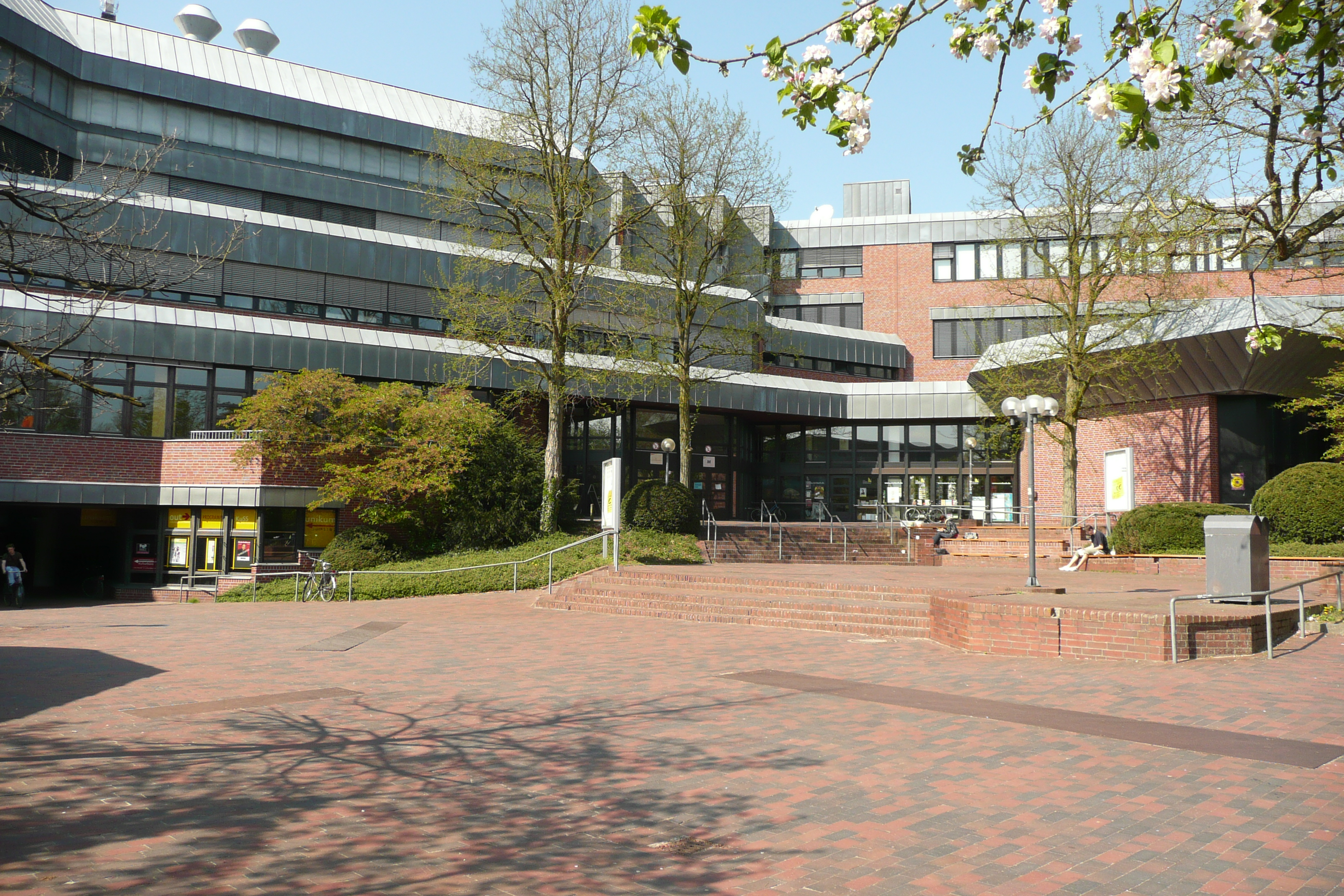
The main building of Uhlhornsweg campus

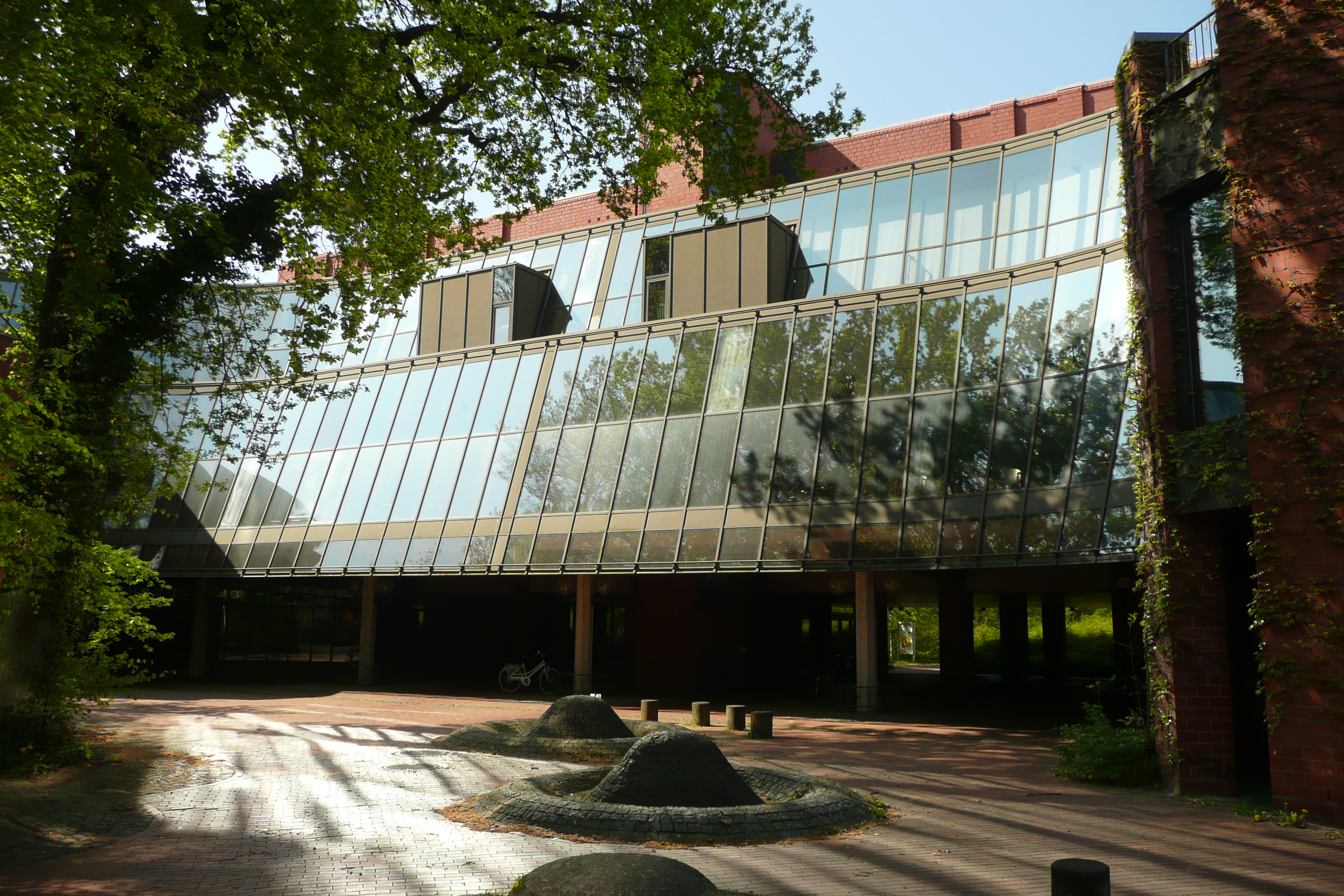
The main building of Wechloy campus, Faculty of Mathematics and Natural Science

The university offers 95 courses of study. Due to the Bologna Process, in 2004 Oldenburg adopted Bachelor and Masters degrees in place of the former Diplom and Magister. One main focus of the university is teacher training, which was established during the 1970s and remains a strong presence with master's degrees in teaching offered in all faculties. The PhD program Didactical reconstruction is especially renowned, as is the research in sustainable development, encompassing several academic disciplines. The university is also allowed to confer Doctorates and oversee Habilitations.

The campus is split into two locations, the major one being Uhlhornsweg, where the main library, the mensa and the administration along with most of the departments is housed. Having used the buildings of the former teaching college during the first years, the main buildings of the university were inaugurated in 1982, with ongoing extensions since then, including the main lecture hall in 2001. The Wechloy campus, also first opened in 1982, is home to the studies of natural sciences as well as the library of natural sciences.

== Departments ==
- Faculty I: Pedagogy and Education

Institute of Education
Institute of Special Education and Rehabilitation Paedagogy
Institute of Social Sciences

- Faculty II: Computer sciences, Law and Economics

Department of Computer science
Department of Economics and Law

- Faculty III: Linguistics and Cultural studies

Institute of English and American Studies
Institute of German Studies
Department of Dutch Studies
Institute of Slavic Studies
Institute of Art and Visual Culture
Institute of Material Culture
Department of Music

- Faculty IV: Social Sciences

Institute of History
Institute of Protestant Theology
Institute of Philosophy
Institute of Sports Science

- Faculty V: Mathematics and Natural Sciences

Institute of Biology and Environmental Sciences (IBU)
Institute of Chemistry
Institute of Physics
Institute of Mathematics
Institute for Chemistry and Biology of the Marine Environment (ICBM)

- Faculty VI: Medicine and Health Sciences

Department of Psychology

== Cultural and political life ==
The Studentenwerk of the university organizes the cultural bureau UNICUM and the theatre since 1985. UNICUM includes theatrical groups from the university as well as freelancers. The group Gegenlicht runs a cinema in the Old Aula and on campus during the summer, while the programme zwergWERK is focused on the presentation of short films.

As in other German universities, the AStA is the most important organ of student representation. It administers the public transport tickets for the student body, offers several forms of student loans and organizes festivities. In addition, the AStA is continually involved in campaigns concerning university policy and social activism.

== Canteens ==
The Studentenwerk Oldenburg operates canteens both the Uhlhornsweg and the Wechloy campus.

In 2001, the cafeteria at Uhlhornsweg took first place in the taste category and ended up in second place overall at the Germany-wide canteen ranking done by UNICUM magazine. The following years, it steadily dropped, but in 2008, it managed to return to second place overall, and again become first ranked in the taste category.

In addition to the canteens, the Studentenwerk operates a large cafeteria on Uhlhornsweg campus. In Wechloy, canteen and cafeteria are combined in the same area.

== International partnerships ==
The first major cross-border cooperation was started in 1980 with the Rijksuniversiteit Groningen. It has since then resulted in an especially far-reaching partnership, with several majors jointly offered by the two universities. Together with the University of Bremen and working closely with the Rijksuniversiteit Groningen the university operates the Hanse Law School which provides degree level programmes in international and comparative law. As at July 2024, there are plans for the School to work closely with the University of Le Havre in France.

The university participates in the ERASMUS programme, a partnership for student exchanges in Europe. It maintains cooperation agreements with 105 universities in 44 countries.

== Awards ==
- The annual Klaus-von-Klitzing Award is jointly awarded by the university and the EWE-Foundation for special commitment in the teaching of natural sciences. Out of the 15.000 Euro prize money, 10.000 have to be invested into a teaching project. It is named for the German Nobel laureate Klaus von Klitzing.
- Also annually during each Tag der Chemie (Chemistry Day), the Angelus-Sala Award is award to the high school students of the region who excelled in chemistry class. It is named for the physician and natural scientist Angelus Sala.

== Notable faculty and alumni ==
- Prodosh Aich (born 1933), indologist
- Hans-Jürgen Appelrath, professor of computer science and information technology
- Jürgen Gmehling, professor of technical and industrial chemistry
- Bettina Meyer, professor, Antarctic researcher
- Niko Paech, economist, substitute professor
- Viktoria Schmidt-Linsenhoff (1944–2013), German art historian and professor
- Björn Thümler (born 1970), German politician

== See also ==
- Botanischer Garten Oldenburg, the university's botanical garden
- North West Shelf Operational Oceanographic System
