= Erol Sabanov =

German footballer (born 1974)

Personal information
- Date of birth: 16 May 1974 (age 52)
- Place of birth: Aalen, West Germany
- Height: 1.83 m (6 ft 0 in)
- Position: Goalkeeper

Team information
- Current team: Stuttgarter Kickers (assistant and goalkeeper coach)

Youth career
- –1993: VfR Aalen

Senior career*
Years	Team	Apps	(Gls)
1993–2002	VfR Aalen		
2002–2004	1. FC Saarbrücken	55	(0)
2005–2006	Jahn Regensburg	44	(0)
2006–2007	SSV Reutlingen	6	(0)
2007–2014	1. FC Heidenheim	172	(0)

Managerial career
- 2014–2015: 1. FC Heidenheim (scout)
- 2015–: Stuttgarter Kickers (goalkeeper coach)
- 2016–: Stuttgarter Kickers (assistant)
- * Club domestic league appearances and goals

Erol Sabanov (born 16 May 1974) is a German former professional footballer who played as a goalkeeper. He is the assistant manager and goalkeeper coach of Stuttgarter Kickers.

== Career ==
Sabanov began his career with VfR Aalen, and spent nine years playing for the first-team, in the Oberliga Baden-Württemberg and later the Regionalliga Süd after the club won promotion in 1999. In 2002, he signed for 1. FC Saarbrücken, with whom he won promotion to the 2. Bundesliga in 2004. He played the first two matches of the 2003–04 season at this level, but lost his place to Peter Eich, and left the club in November 2004. In January 2005, Sabanov signed for Jahn Regensburg, where he spent eighteen months, leaving in 2006 after the club were relegated from the Regionalliga Süd. He spent a year with SSV Reutlingen, serving as understudy to Marco Langner, before joining 1. FC Heidenheim of the Oberliga Baden-Württemberg in 2007.

Sabanov was Heidenheim's first choice goalkeeper as they won promotion to the Regionalliga Süd in his first season, and to the 3. Liga the following year. He lost his place to Frank Lehmann for the 2011–12 season, but won it back eleven games into the following season. He retired at the end of the 2013–14 season, having helped Heidenheim win promotion to the 2. Bundesliga.

== Personal life ==
Sabanov is of Turkish Bulgarian origin.
