= Ricker =

Ricker is a surname. Notable people with the surname include:

- Bill Ricker (1908–2001), one of the founders of fisheries science.
- Bob Ricker (contemporary), executive director of the American Hunters and Shooters Association
- Debbie Ricker (born 1965), American reproductive biologist and academic administrator
- Ezekiel Ricker (1819–1854), Wisconsin pioneer.
- Maëlle Ricker (born 1978), Canadian athlete, 2006 and 2010 Winter Olympics contestant
- Nathan Clifford Ricker (1843–1924), American professor and architect
- Shaun Ricker (born 1982), American professional wrestler better known as LA Knight
- Nickname for Ricky Stratton, a fictional character on Silver Spoons

== See also ==
- Ricker Bay, Wisconsin
- CCGS W. E. Ricker, Canadian Coast Guard offshore fisheries research vessel
- Ricker College, former college (1848–1978) in Houlton, Maine, USA
- Ricker model, statistical population model
- Ricker wavelet, contiuous wavelet function
