= Bettina Meyer =

German Antarctic researcher

- Education: BSc Giessen University; BSc University of Kiel; PhD University of Rostock
- Scientific career
- Fields: Marine biology
- Workplaces: Alfred Wegener Institute for Polar and Marine Research
- Website: Bettina Meyer at the Alfred Wegener Institute

Bettina Meyer is a German Antarctic researcher, best known for her work on the ecology and physiology of invertebrates in the pelagic zone. She is the head of the ecophysiology of pelagic key species working group at the Alfred Wegener Institute for Polar and Marine Research (AWI).

== Early life and education ==
From 1987 to 1992 Meyer read biology, focusing on Marine biology and oceanography, at Giessen University and at the Kiel University. In 1996 she received her PhD, titled "Feeding strategies of the calanoid copepods in two different tropicalised areas in the Baltic Sea (Pomeranian Bay, Gotland Sea)", at the University of Rostock. In 2010 she completed a postdoc at the University Bremen, focusing on ecophysiological studies on the overwintering of Antarctic krill (Euphausia superba). She then completed a science management course in 2011 at the Malik Management School, Switzerland.

== Career and impact ==
Meyer specialises in marine biology and ecophysiology with an interest in the biodiversity and biological flows of matter in the pelagic zone of the polar seas. Her research focuses on key polar invertebrates such as Antarctic krill, copepods, amphipods, and gelatinous plankton (e.g. salps, jellyfish). She also researches the impact of endogenous clocks on the life cycle of these organisms, their adaptability and performance to environmental stressors based on their physiological and genetic traits, as well as their role in biogeochemical cycles.

From 1992 to 1996 and again during 1998 Meyer was a research associate at the Leibniz Institute for Baltic Sea Research, Germany. In 1997 she completed a one-year research associate position at the Plymouth Marine Laboratory in Plymouth (UK), funded by a prestigious EU Marie Curie postdoc fellowship. Since 1999 she has been a research associate at the Alfred Wegener Institute for Polar and Marine Research (AWI), within the Polar Biological Oceanography section. Meyer is the current head of the Ecophysiology of pelagic key species working group at AWI, while also heading the international and collaborative project Helmholtz Virtual Institute PolarTime: Biological rhythms and clocks in polar pelagic invertebrates. She has travelled to the Southern Ocean on a number of occasions on the RV Aurora Australis, and the RV Polarstern.

From 2009–2011 Meyer collaborated with Prof. Kramer and Dr M. Teschke in the Chronobiology Research Group at the Charité hospital and University of Medicine, Berlin, was an active member of the Lazarev Sea Krill Study (LAKRIS), the German contribution to Southern Ocean Global Ocean Ecosystems Dynamics (SO-GLOBEC) from 2005–2008 and served as a board member on the Antarctic Climate and Ecosystems Cooperative Research Centre (ACE CRC). Meyer currently serves on the senate commission on oceanography at the German Research Foundation (DFG) and is an associate member of SO-eEOV WG (designing a biological observing system in the Southern Ocean to inform global ocean observing of marine ecosystems).

Meyer holds a professorship at the University of Oldenburg (Germany), where she heads a project at the Institute for Chemistry and Biology of the Oceans (ICBM) focusing on the biodiversity and biological processes of the polar oceans.

== Awards and honors ==
Meyer was awarded the EU Marie Curie postdoc fellowship in 1997 to work in the Zooplankton group at the Plymouth Marine Laboratory.

== Selected works ==
- Atkinson, A.; Meyer, B.; Stübing, D.; Hagen, W.; Schmidt, K.; Bathmann, U. V. (5 April 2002). "Feeding and energy budgets of Antarctic krill Euphausia superba at the onset of winter—II. Juveniles and adults" (PDF). Limnology and Oceanography. 47 (4): 953–966. Bibcode:2002LimOc..47..953A. doi:10.4319/lo.2002.47.4.0953. OCLC 900548442.
- Meyer, Bettina; Fuentes, Veronica; Guerra, Citlali; Schmidt, Katrin; Atkinson, Angus; Spahic, Susanne; Cisewski, Boris; Freier, Ulrich; Olariaga, Alejandro (2009). "Physiology, growth, and development of larval krill Euphausia superba in autumn and winter in the Lazarev Sea, Antarctica" (PDF). Limnology and Oceanography. 54 (5): 1595–1614. Bibcode:2009LimOc..54.1595M. doi:10.4319/lo.2009.54.5.1595. hdl:10261/20334. OCLC 773940205.
- Meyer, B.; Saborowski, R.; Atkinson, A.; Buchholz, F.; Bathmann, U. (1 November 2002). "Seasonal differences in citrate synthase and digestive enzyme activity in larval and postlarval antarctic krill, Euphausia superba" (PDF). Marine Biology. 141 (5): 855–862. doi:10.1007/s00227-002-0877-7. ISSN 0025-3162.
- Meyer, Bettina; Auerswald, Lutz; Siegel, Volker; Spahić, Susanne; Pape, Cartsten; Fach, Bettina A.; Teschke, Mathias; Lopata, Andreas L.; Fuentes, Veronica (5 January 2010). "Seasonal variation in body composition, metabolic activity, feeding, and growth of adult krill Euphausia superba in the Lazarev Sea" (PDF). Marine Ecology Progress Series. 398: 1–18. Bibcode:2010MEPS..398....1M. doi:10.3354/meps08371.
