= Hanse Law School =

Law project in Germany

The Hanse Law School is a project of two universities, and was established in 2002. The University of Bremen and the Carl-von-Ossietzky University of Oldenburg jointly offer a bachelor's degree in Comparative and European Law and a master's degree in Transnational Law.

According to the University of Oldenburg website, the School works in close collaboration with the University of Groningen in the Netherlands and shortly (as ay July 2024) with the University of Le Havre in France.

The degree courses are intended to prepare students for the international market and do not prepare students directly for employment in the German judicial system.
