= Icke =

Icke is a name and it may refer to:

== Surname ==
- David Icke (born 1952), English conspiracy theorist
- Robert Icke, English writer and director
- Laurie Icke (1929–2010), Australian rules footballer
- Steven Icke (born 1956), Australian rules footballer
- Vincent Icke, Dutch cosmologist and theoretical astrophysicist after whom the asteroid 7508 Icke was named

== Nickname ==
- Thomas "Icke" Häßler (b. 1966), German football player

== See also ==
- Ickes
- Ike (disambiguation)
- Eich (surname)
