= Eiche =

Eiche can refer to:

== Places ==
- Eiche (Potsdam), a locality (Ortsteil) of Potsdam, Germany
- Eiche (Barnim), a locality (Ortsteil) of Ahrensfelde, Germany
- Eiche or Eichbach (Hahle), a short river in Eichsfeld district, Germany

== Historical events ==
- Operation Eiche, also known as the Gran Sasso raid in World War II

== Surname ==
- Genrich Eiche (1893–1968), Latvian military historian

== See also ==
- Eich (disambiguation)
