= Institute for Chemistry and Biology of the Marine Environment =

German marine science institute

Coordinates: 53.5148°N 8.1461°E

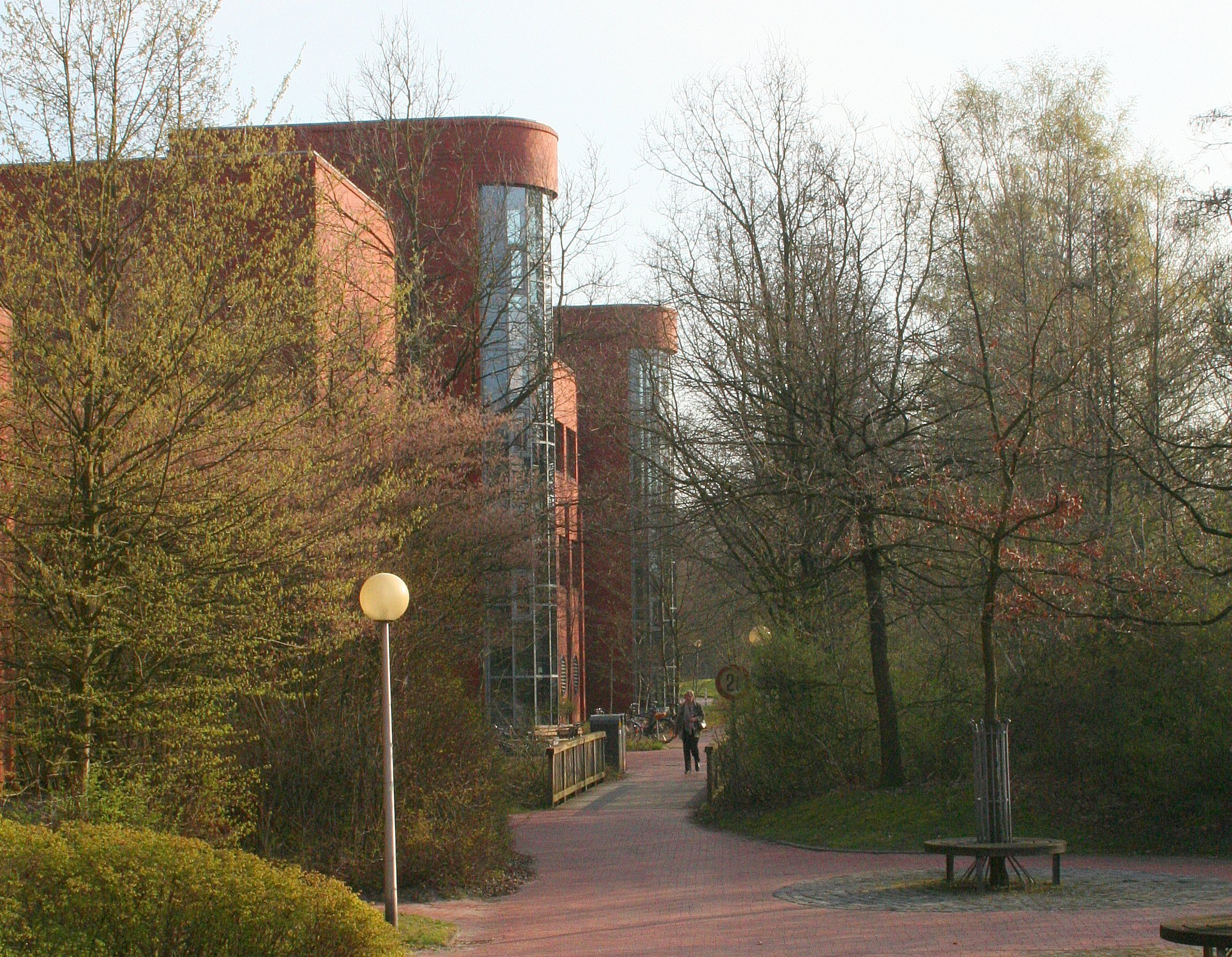
The ICBM main building in Oldenburg; Germany

The Institute for Chemistry and Biology of the Marine Environment of the Carl von Ossietzky University of Oldenburg (German: Institut für Chemie und Biologie des Meeres der Carl von Ossietzky Universität Oldenburg, abbreviated ICBM) is one of the marine science institutes at the German coast and the only university-based marine research institute in Lower Saxony, Germany. The ICBM is located on the campus Wechloy in Oldenburg, with locations in Wilhelmshaven and on the island of Spiekeroog (in relation to the national park centre Wittbülten on the area of the Hermann Lietz School). The ICBM operates the Wadden Sea time series station Spiekeroog (WSS) and several research vessels.

== Mission statement and research ==
The ICBM carries out fundamental and applied research in marine and environmental sciences. Interdisciplinary research will provide understanding of the various interactions of marine environmental systems. The research focuses on marine biogeochemical cycles and energy fluxes, as well as on the functional role of marine biodiversity, especially in coastal zones worldwide, and in the oceans. The mathematical modelling of different environmental systems is complemented by modern, high-resolution analytics and in-house marine sensor developments. The institute is composed of three sections covering altogether 18 research groups:

- Section Geochemistry and Analytics
- Section Biology and Ecology
- Section Physics and Modelling

For a better understanding of the complex relations the ICBM aims to foster interdisciplinary research.

== Academic training ==
The courses of study are closely related to the research activities to provide interdisciplinary and research-oriented training. The institute offers a broad bachelor programme with contents of marine, environmental and landscape-ecological sciences as well as four Master Programmes which are: Marine Environmental Sciences, Microbiology (held in English), Environmental Modelling and Marine Sensors. In cooperation with the ICBM, the Jade University of Applied Sciences offers a Bachelor Programme which is fundamental for marine engineering. The ICBM is ERASMUS exchange partner for students.

== History ==
In July 1987, Lower Saxony’s minister of Science and Art approved the establishment of the ICBM as a cooperation of the university departments of mathematics, biology, physics and chemistry. In 1991, the ICBM was approved as a central organisation of the University of Oldenburg. The registered association „Centre for Research on Shallow seas, Coastal Zones and the Marine Environment – Research Centre Terramare” (Zentrum für Flachmeer-, Küsten- und Meeresumweltforschung e.V. – Forschungszentrum Terramare) which was founded in 1990 in Wilhelmshaven and financed through federal state resources was incorporated into the ICBM in 2008. The former directors of the ICBM are Wolfgang Krumbein, Ulrich Kattmann, Hans Joachim Schellnhuber, Bruno Eckhardt, Wolfgang Ebenhöh, Heribert Cypionka, Meinhard Simon, Hans-Jürgen Brumsack, Ulrike Feudel, Jürgen Rullkötter, Helmut Hillebrand, Bernd Blasius and Oliver Zielinski. At present, the institute is headed by Heinz Wilkes.

== Cooperations and memberships ==
The ICBM cooperates closely with the Max Planck Institute for Marine Microbiology und MARUM, both located in Bremen; with the Alfred Wegener Institute in Bremerhaven, as well as with the Senckenberg Institute by the Sea and the Jade University of Applied Sciences, both located in Wilhelmshaven. The ICBM is a member of the German Marine Research Consortium (KDM) and of the Northwest Marine Research Association (NWMV).
