= Runner Automobiles =

Motorcycle manufacturer company of Bangladesh

Runner Automobiles PLC
- Logo since 2000

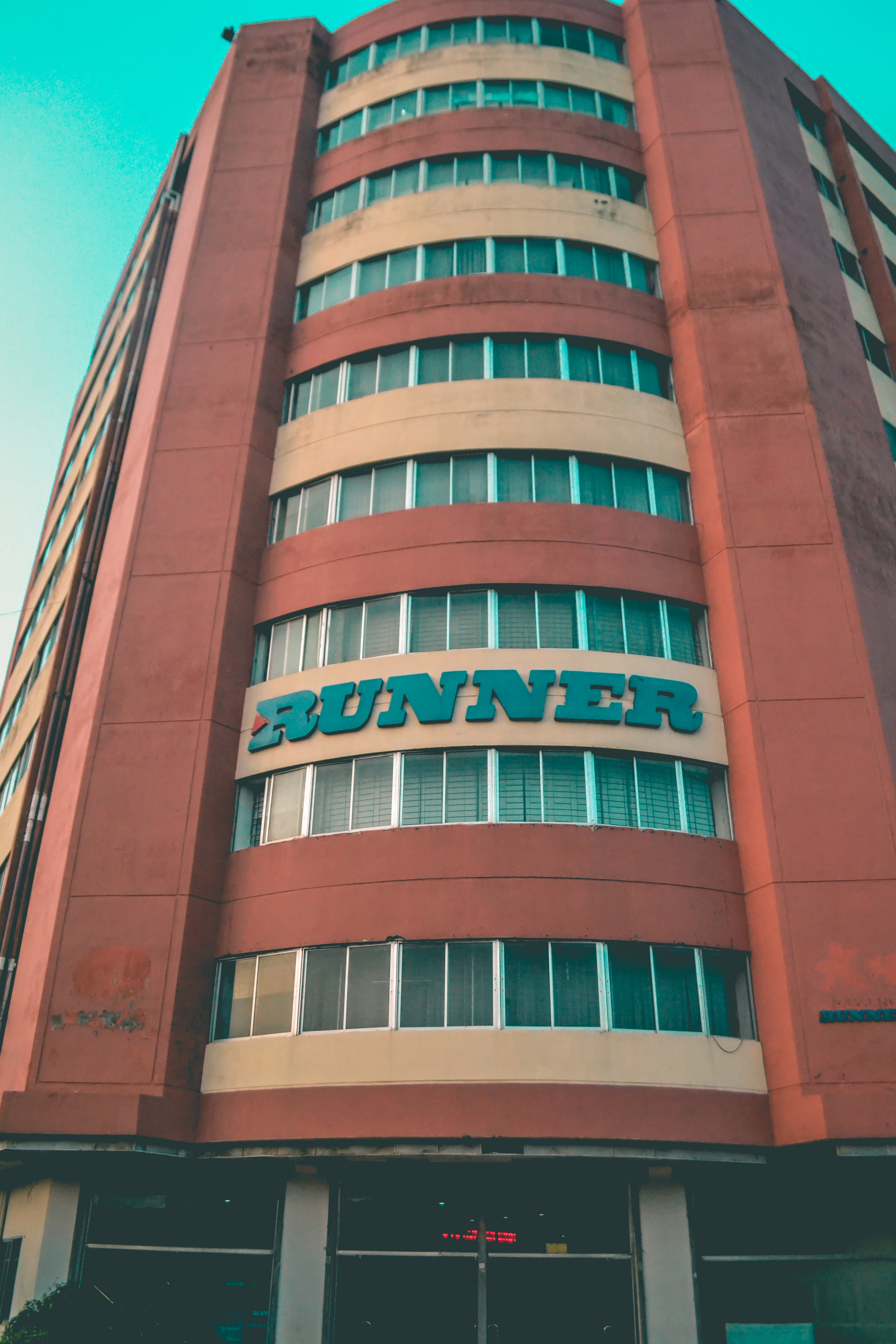
- Corporate Office of Runner Automobiles PLC
- Type: Public limited company
- Industry: Automotive
- Founded: June 4, 2000; 26 years ago
- Founder: Hafizur Rahman Khan
- Headquarters: Dhaka, Bangladesh,
- Key people: Nazrul Mu. Is. FCA (GMD)
- Products: Motorcycles, Scooters
- Production output: ▲50,000 units
- Revenue: ▲US$180 million (2018)
- Operating income: ▲US$18 million (2018)
- Net income: ▲US$50 million (2018)
- Total assets: ▲US$280 million (2018)
- Parent: Runner Group of Companies
- Rating: Rating- A3 by Credit Rating Agency of Bangladesh Ltd

Runner Automobiles PLC (RAPLC) is a motorcycle and three-wheeler manufacturer based in Bangladesh. The company produces a range of motorcycles varying in size from 80 to 150 CC, and has become a major player in the sub 100 CC motorcycle segment in the country. In addition to motorcycles, Runner also produces three-wheeler auto-rickshaws in its Blaluka factory. The increase in disposable income among the general population and a rapidly growing middle class has contributed to the rise in demand for two-wheelers in Bangladesh. Runner offers 12 different models of motorcycles and scooters, with capacities ranging from 80 CC to 150 CC.

== History ==
Hafizur Rahman Khan established and is the chairman of Runner Automobiles PLC. The company was incorporated as a private limited company in July 2000, and started its commercial operation since 2000 as an importer and trader of motorcycles. Later, it was converted to a public limited company in January 2012 and started the business of manufacturing and selling motorcycles, and later three-wheeled vehicles. Subsequently, the company established its facility of assembling engines and manufacturing other parts of motorcycles and presently established its effective distribution channel throughout the country with a network of more than 100 active dealers and over 270 sales centers along with own 27 operational showrooms. RAL's manufacturing facility is located at Bhaluka, Mymensingh. The factory is constructed with pre-fabricated steel structure on its own premises of 4,944.04 decimals land with a covered space of over 4,40,310 sft.

== Technical collaborations ==
Runner has had technical collaborations with Dayang Motors and Lohia Machinery Freedom in the past. In 2016, Runner Automobiles PLC signed a collaboration agreement with UM Motorcycles to manufacture UM motorcycles in Bangladesh under the name of UM-Runner. The motorcycles will be manufactured at Runner's motorcycle manufacturing facilities at Bhaluka while UM International LLC will provide R&D support in technological & engineering fields as well as global component sourcing. UM-Runner motorcycles manufactured in Bangladesh, entered the market in the second quadrant of 2018. As per of the agreement Runner Automobiles PLC in future will produce & export bikes for UM for Nepal & Sri Lanka. It has technical collaboration with Indian automaker Bajaj Auto to build at least 70% parts 3-wheeler auto-rikshaw including the chassis, body welding and painting, except for some components of the engine. Experts from Bajaj have provided technical support to manufacturing processes and conducting test-runs for the vehicle. The 3-wheeler can run either on liquefied petroleum gas (LPG) or compressed natural gas (CNG).

== Products ==
The principal product of the company is 2 Wheeler and 3 Wheeler. The products are sold to customers and corporate clients through dealers. Company also owns Company Operated (COCO) stores through tenders and recently initiated online retail stores. RAPLC's products range varies from 80cc to 150cc with about 12 models of 2 wheeler and scooters.

== Factory ==
Runner Automobile PLC has its own manufacturing plant at Mymensingh District which is approximately 70 kilometer away from the capital Dhaka city. The factory covers an area of 200,000 square feet. The factory is constructed on prefabricated steel structure on the company's own land.

It employs around 450 employees which includes factory manager, engineers, technicians, and workers. It has production lines for pressing, wielding, assembling of engine, painting and quality control.

The factory is capable of producing four series of motorcycles. It produces twelve models of motorcycles. The plant capacity for producing motorcycles each day is 500.

Runner being a manufacturer has been gearing up its research and development facilities especially in areas of Product Development and Testing. Apart from having various machines and equipment like Salt Spray Test Chamber, Coordinate Measuring Machine, Suspension Test Machine, Universal Load Test Bench, Electric Component Test Bench etc. RAPLC has recently ordered certain latest Test facilities like 2 Wheeler & 3 Wheeler Engine and Chassis Dynamo-meters from India which would further help enhance the Products performance on parameters of Torque, Power Acceleration, Fuel efficiency, Braking, Gradient Drive-ability and emissions etc. These engine and chassis dynamometers would be commissioned within 2016 and strengthen RAPLC R&D efforts.

== Latest Developments ==
Runner has targeted the electric vehicles segment and announced plans to build a nationwide charging network to support EV sales in Bangladesh.

== See also ==
- List of companies of Bangladesh
- Automotive industry in Bangladesh
