= SOS Hermann Gmeiner School, Faridabad =

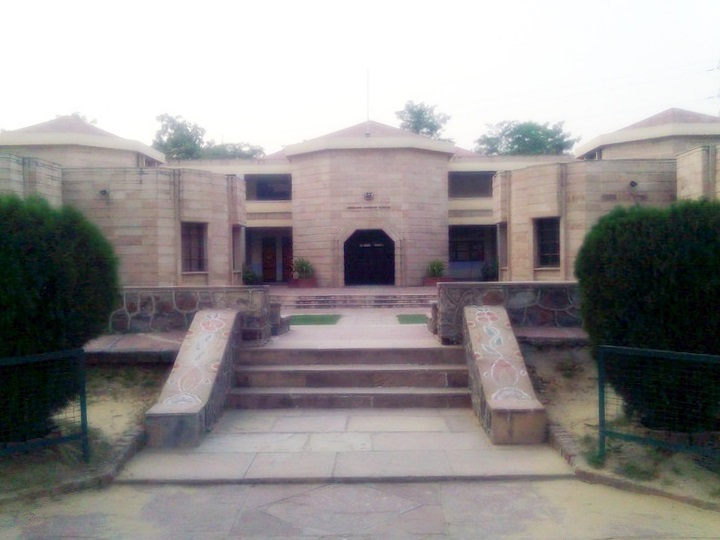
- SOS Hermann Gmeiner School (Sector-29)

Location
- SOS Enclave, Sector 29; Faridabad, Haryana; India; 28.437°N 77.322°E

Information
- Type: Private School
- Established: 1986
- Faculty: Full time
- Area: 8 acre
- Color: Blue
- Affiliations: Central Board of Secondary Education
- Website: www.hgsfaridabad.org

SOS Hermann Gmeiner School, Faridabad was founded in 1986 by Shri J.N Kaul, the then President, SOS Children's Villages (an organisation based in Austria). The school is one of the oldest in Faridabad. The school campus is situated in sector 29 near district police lines and was designed by a German architect.

Hermann Gmeiner School is also known for its children's village, which is a home to orphans. The school is based on the CBSE pattern and the medium of instruction is English. SOS Hermann Gmeiner School has its branches in almost all states of India and in about 180 countries and provides free education and housing to orphans. Hermann Gmeiner School was opened to outside and other children in 1986 with an affiliation from CBSE. The school also provides vocational education and industrial training.

In November 2021, the president of the SOS Children's Villages International visited the school.
