= Benjamin Eicher =

Film director known for cult sequels

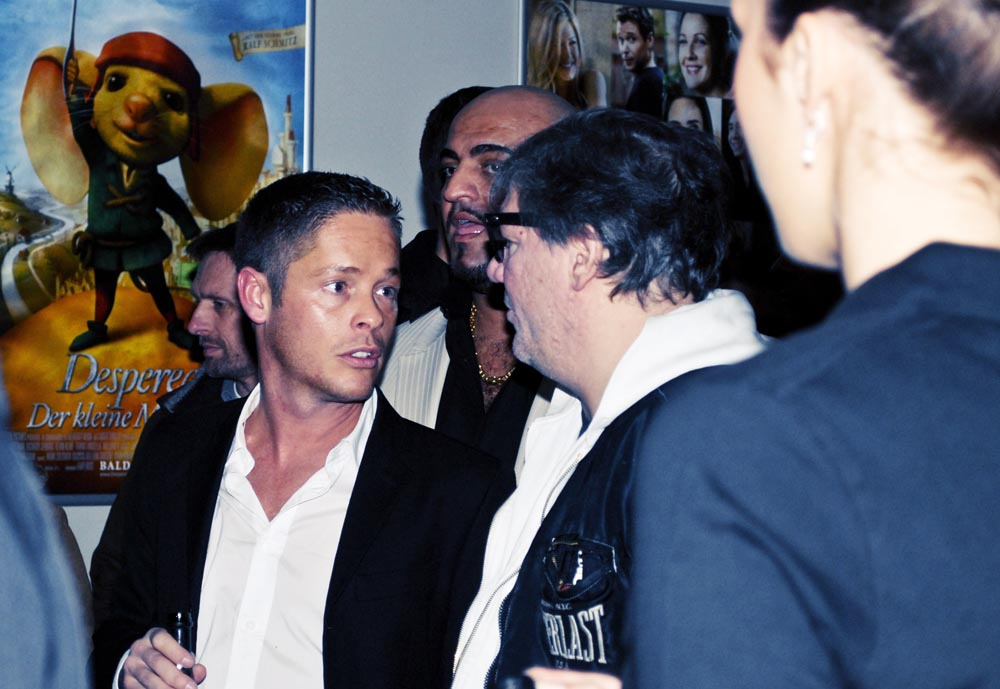
Benjamin Eicher and Claude-Oliver in 2008

Benjamin Eicher (born 31 March 1974 in Tübingen, Germany) is a film director famous for his cult film sequel Dei Mudder Sei Gesicht II and further feature-length gangster comedies.

His company Los Banditos Films, founded in 2000 together with Timo Joh. Mayer, produces controversial movies with stylistic influences from American and French film. Lately they concentrate on filming in Street Gangster Movies.

Dei Mudder Sei Gesicht I – III and Schaffe schaffe Scheiße baue are said to be Germany's most-watched underground movies.

In addition to his feature-length movies Benjamin Eicher has directed numerous shorts, television commercials and music videos since 1996.

== Filmography (selection) ==
- Dei Mudder sei Gesicht (1997)
- Boh Fett – Dei Mudder sei Gesicht 2 (2001)
- Schaffe schaffe Scheiße baue (2001)
- Der kalte Tod (2002, short)
- Schluss mit Mudder (2002)
- Behind the Wall (2003, short)
- Camera Obscura (2003)
- Wenn der Klatschmohn blüht (2003, short)
- Kampfansage – Der Film (2003)
- A Lovely Young Girl (2004)
- Abgezockt ist Abgezockt (2005)
- Amok (2005, short)
- Kopf oder Zahl (2009)
