= Botanischer Garten Oldenburg =

Botanical garden in Lower Saxony, Germany

Coordinates: 53°8′51″N 8°11′53″E

The Botanischer Garten Oldenburg (3.7 hectares at its public site at Philosophenweg, plus 1.5 nonpublic hectares at Küpkersweg), more formally known as the Botanischer Garten der Carl von Ossietzky-Universität Oldenburg, is a botanical garden maintained by the University of Oldenburg. Its public gardens are located at Philosophenweg 39, Oldenburg, Lower Saxony, Germany, and open daily without charge.

The garden was established in 1882 as a teaching garden, enhanced in 1913, and in 1916 augmented by a systematic garden (still existing) of 1200 plant species from Oldenburg and East Frisia. Four geographic divisions were created in 1932 for Boreal, Atlantic, Mediterranean, and Pontic species, with an additional area for species from the Central Mountains. Starting in 1933 the garden was administered by Oldenburg, and in 1951 it was taken up by Lower Saxony and extended to its current size. Its heath, marsh, dunes, and forest areas were redesigned in 1966, as well as the medicinal plant garden in 1967, and in 1968 a Department of Central and Southern German plant communities was created. In 1976 the garden was incorporated into the University of Oldenburg, and in 1984 today's nonpublic Küpkersweg site added. Through the 1990s, the alpine garden, Mediterranean collection, and medicinal garden were reorganized, and a new cactus house built. A new cottage garden was added in 2000, with heath, marsh, and dune areas again reworked in 2001.

Today the garden is a scientific institution for teaching and research at the university. It currently cultivates about 4000 taxa. Current research projects, as of 2009:

- Phylogeny of genus Hypericum
- Flora of Paraguay - Cactaceae

== See also ==
- List of botanical gardens in Germany
