= Eicher (surname) =

Eicher is a German surname. Notable people with the surname include:

- Ashley Eicher, on-air entertainment personality from Louisville, Kentucky who competed in the Miss America pageant
- Benjamin Eicher (born 1974), film director
- David J. Eicher (born 1961), American amateur astronomer and author
- Edward C. Eicher (1878–1944), American politician
- JD Eicher (born 1986), American singer-songwriter
- Jennifer Eicher (born 1962), Swiss-American equestrian
- Joanne Eicher (born 1930), American professor
- John H. Eicher (1921–2016), American chemist
- Manfred Eicher (born 1943), German record producer, the founder of the ECM record label
- Stephan Eicher (born 1960), Swiss chansonnier
- Vitus Eicher (born 1990), German footballer
