= Aich =

Aich may refer to:

- Aich, Styria, a municipality in Styria, Austria
- Aich (surname), a Bengali Hindu surname
- Aich (river), a river in Baden-Württemberg, Germany
- Aich's Alloy, a type of brass
- Gut Aich Priory, a Benedictine monastery in St. Gilgen in Austria
- Animesh Aich, Bangladeshi film maker, actor, director and writer
- Jewel Aich, Bangladeshi magician and bansuri player
- Manohar Aich (1912–2016), Indian bodybuilder
- Prodosh Aich (born 1933), retired Bengali-Indian professor, author of several books

AICH may refer to:

- AICH, Advanced Intelligent Corruption Handling, a corruption handling method used in eMule
- American Indian Community House

== See also ==
- Eich (disambiguation)
