= Utz Aichinger =

German hockey player (1938–2023)

Personal information
- Nationality: West Germany
- Born: 13 June 1938 Stuttgart, Gau Württemberg-Hohenzollern, Germany
- Died: 10 May 2023 (aged 84)
- Height: 1.80 m (5 ft 11 in)
- Weight: 78 kg (172 lb)

Sport
- Sport: Field hockey

Utz Aichinger (13 June 1938 – 10 May 2023) was a West German field hockey player. He competed in the 1968 Summer Olympics.

Aichinger died on 10 May 2023, at the age of 84.
