= Bernd-Eichinger-Platz =

Public square in Maxvorstadt, Germany

Coordinates: 48.146825°N 11.56962°E

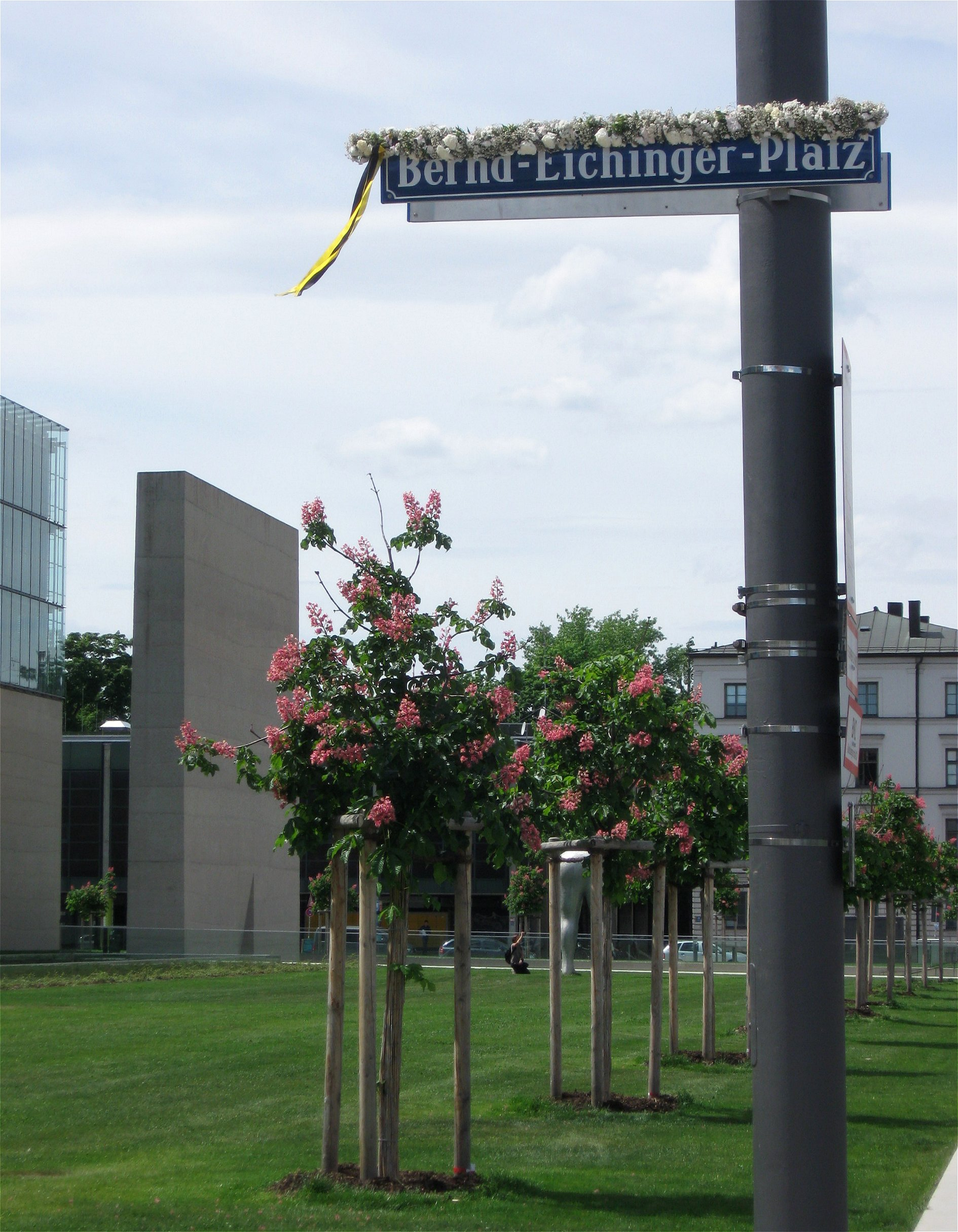

Bernd-Eichinger-Platz is a square in the Munich district of Maxvorstadt. It refers to the area in front of the entrance to the University of Television and Film Munich and then to Gabelsbergerstraße.

== History ==
After film producer Bernd Eichinger died of a heart attack in January 2011, his widow Katja Eichinger suggested that the city of Munich name a place after him in memory of Eichinger's services to Munich as a film location and his life's work. The green space in front of the Hochschule für Fernsehen und Film, where Eichinger himself had studied, was chosen as an appropriate location. The Bavarian Finance Minister Markus Söder agreed to a corresponding proposal. The university also welcomed the idea. By decision of the Munich City Council of 19 April 2012 the name was made official.

On 7 May 2012, the street sign was ceremoniously unveiled by Lord Mayor Ude in the presence of Eichinger's widow Katja and daughter Nina.
