= Hinterhoftheater (Munich) =

Theatre in Munich city, Bavaria, Germany

Coordinates: 48°11′48″N 11°34′36″E

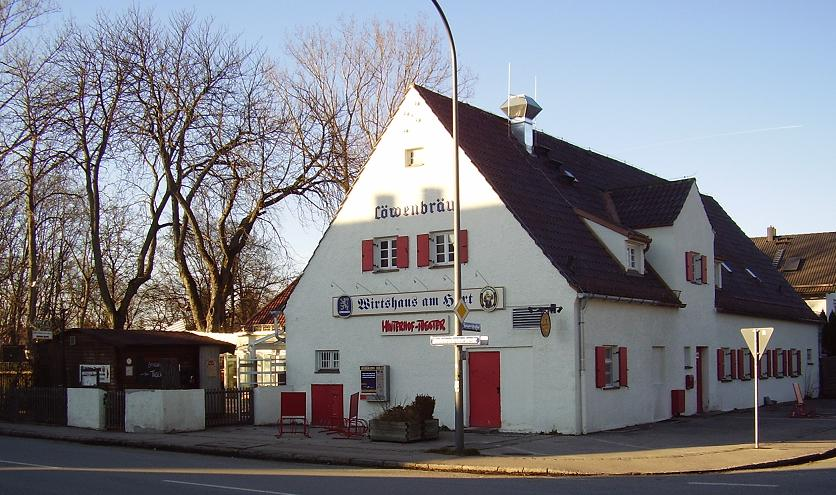

Hinterhoftheater is a theatre in Munich, Bavaria, Germany.
