= Edward Eicker =

Edward Eicker (born May 22, 1975) is a composer of choral and instrumental music for both small and large ensembles. He holds an M.A. in Music Composition (2002) and a B.M. in Music Education and Organ Performance (1999) from Roosevelt University. His principal teachers have included David Schrader and Samuel Soria and composers Stacy Garrop and Patricia Morehead.

Since 2000, Eicker has received various awards, commissions and publications, including being named a finalist in the 2007 "Outside the Bachs" Choral Composition Contest. His most popular organ works include "Just a Minute: A Suite of Miniature for Organ," and its sequel, "Just (A)nother Minute." His other organ and choral works are published by GIA Publications, Inc., World Library Publications, Augsburg Fortress, and Graphite Publishers.

Eicker currently serves as music director at St. Paul of the Cross Church in Park Ridge, Illinois. He lives in Des Plaines with his wife and two sons.

== Publications ==
GIA Publications, Inc./World Library Publications

https://www.giamusic.com/store/search?elSearchTerm=Edward+eicker&giaSession=sm

Oregon Catholic Press

https://www.ocp.org/en-us/search?q=Edward+Eicker&c=artist%3Bblog%3Bevent%3Bpage%3Bproduct%3Bsong%3Bcollection

MorningStar Music Publishers

https://www.jwpepper.com/Steal-Away-to-Jesus/10368665.item#.YvgTji-cbOQ
