= UM Motorcycles =

American motorcycle manufacturer

United Motors Motorcycles
- Type: Corporation
- Industry: Motorcycle
- Founder: Octavio Villegas Llano
- Headquarters: Miami, Florida, United States
- Website: ummotorcycles.com

UM-Motorcycles (United Motors) is an American motorcycle manufacturer headquartered in Miami (USA), established in 1999.

== History ==
UM Motorcycles has its origins in Miami FL since 1999. Recognizing growing demand for motorcycle products worldwide, UM entered the powersports market in the early '90s by forging agreements with leading motorcycle manufacturers in China and Taiwan to develop its products and began distribution in North America and Latin America in year 1999. By 2005 the company had close to 200 authorized UM dealers the US across North America. In 2005 UM signed a collaboration and supply agreement with Hyosung Motorcycles from South Korea under agreement with S&T Motors. After the 2008 financial crisis more than 50% of UM dealers in North America closed shop and United Motors had to repurchase millions of dollars from 200 dealers. On Feb 1, 2010, UM decided to focus on the international markets and suspended distribution of UM motorcycles for the US market only. UM appointed Martin Racing Performance for the distribution of all spare parts in the US market and continued to operate in Miami focusing on International expansion. In 2014, UM announced their entry to India through an Indian subsidiary, UM Motorcycles, marketing themselves as an "American Manufacturer" with origins in the U.S.

== Joint ventures ==
In 2016 UM Motors entered the Indian market (which accounts for 78 percentage of the global two-wheeler demand) with a 50:50 joint venture with Lohia Auto. It has invested 100 crores in a plant at Kashipur, Uttarakhand capable of producing 5000 units a month, and is headquartered in New Delhi. The company has rolled out two 280 cc cruiser motorcycles in India – Renegade Commando and Renegade Sport S and currently has 50 dealerships.

The UM Lohia venture will also export motorcycles to Nepal, besides other South Asian markets. The current level of localisation is 60 percentage with engines and fuel tanks being imported. Karan Singh Grover is the brand ambassador for the UM Lohia venture.

This venture ended in 2021 because of shareholder disagreements and COVID related issues .

=== Technical Collaborations ===
In 2016, Runner Automobiles of Bangladesh signed a collaboration agreement with UM to manufacture UM motorcycles in Bangladesh under the name of UM-Runner . The motorcycles will be manufactured at Runner's motorcycle manufacturing facilities at Bhaluka while UM International LLC will provide R&D support in technological & engineering fields as well as global component sourcing. Bangladeshi manufactured UM-Runner motorcycles entered the market in the second quadrant of 2018. As per of the agreement Runner Automobiles in future will produce and export bikes for UM for Nepal and Sri Lanka.
