= Pachystachys lutea =

Scientific classification
- Kingdom: Plantae
- Clade: Tracheophytes
- Clade: Angiosperms
- Clade: Eudicots
- Clade: Asterids
- Order: Lamiales
- Family: Acanthaceae
- Genus: Pachystachys
- Species: P. lutea

Binomial name
- Pachystachys lutea Nees

Species of plant

Pachystachys lutea, known as the golden shrimp plant or lollipop plant, is a tropical, soft-stemmed evergreen shrub between 0.5 and 2.5 meters tall, native to Peru. The zygomorphic, long-throated, short-lived white flowers emerge sequentially from overlapping bright yellow bracts on racemes that are produced throughout the warm months.

The Latin specific epithet lutea means "yellow".

It is cultivated as an ornamental, but in cold temperate regions it requires protection from temperatures below 10 °C (50 °F). It has won the Royal Horticultural Society's Award of Garden Merit.

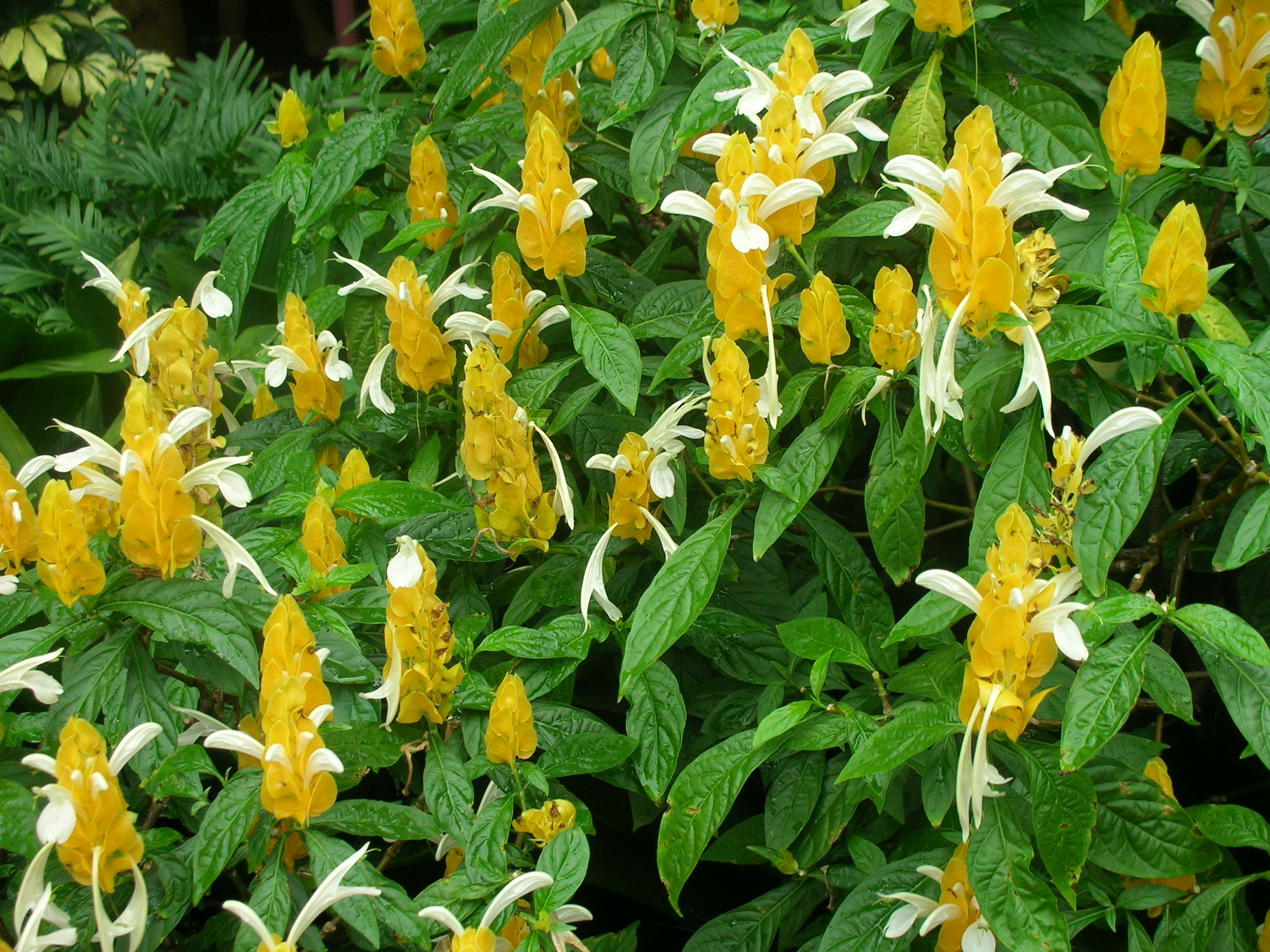

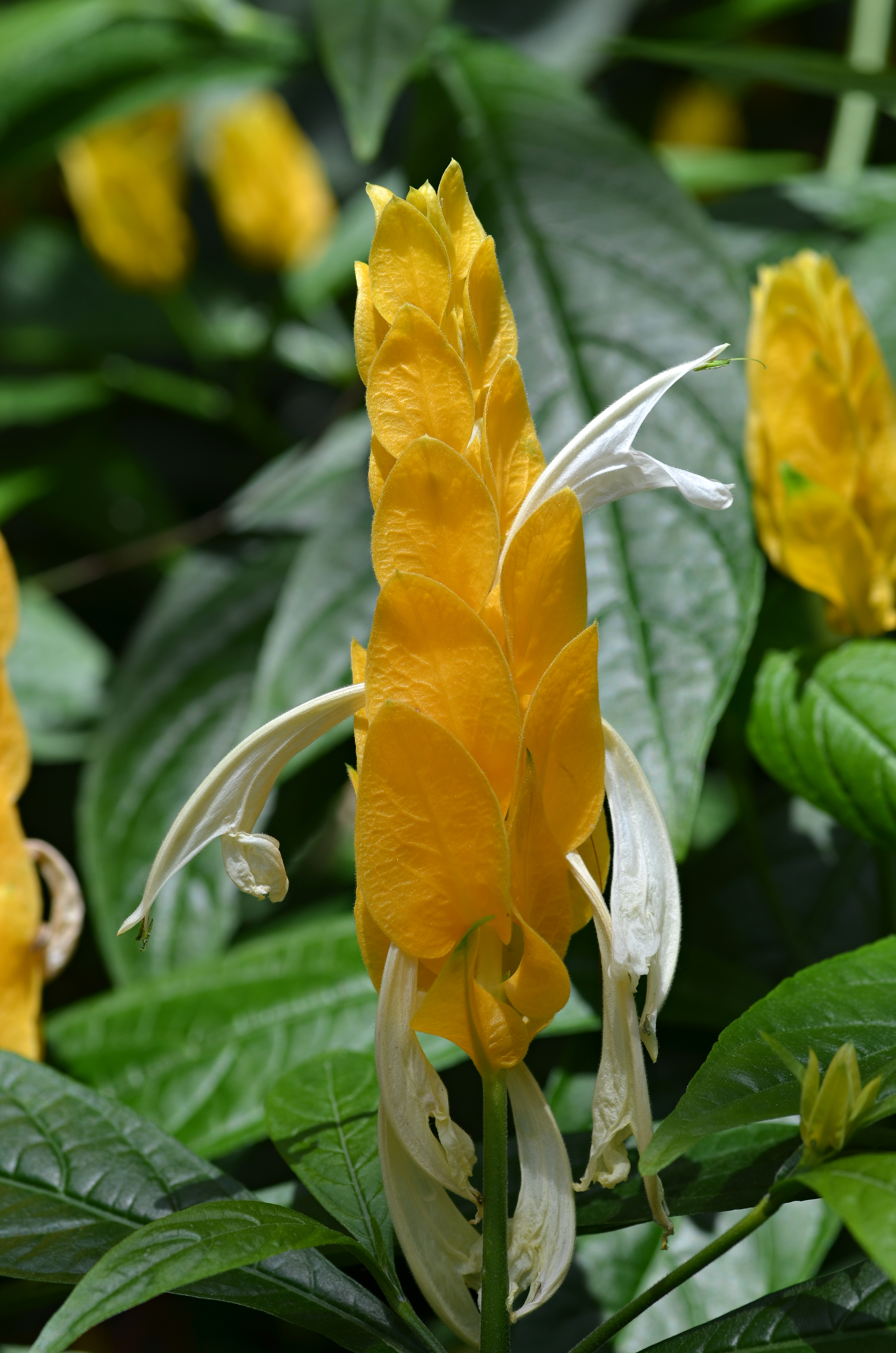
Close up of the bracts

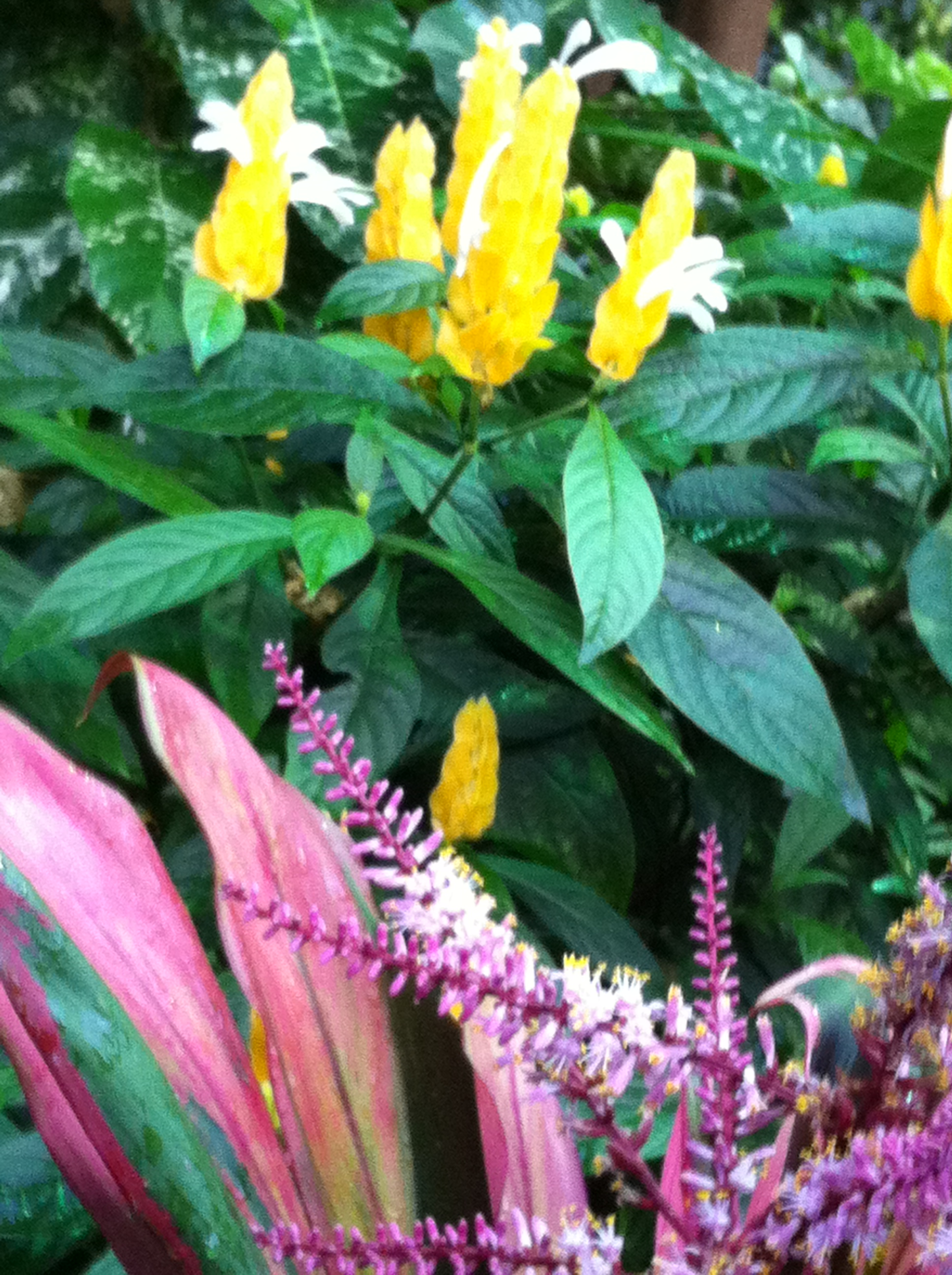
Flowers emerging from the bract
