= Bob Ricker =

Robert Allen Ricker (January 8, 1951 - December 4, 2009) was a member of the board of directors and executive director of the American Hunters and Shooters Association who resigned on January 6, 2009, after accusing gun manufacturers of "irresponsible" and "negligent" behavior.

== Early career ==
Ricker graduated from George Mason University School of Law and began his career in 1977 as a trial lawyer for a Northern Virginia law firm. In 1981, he was hired as an Assistant General Counsel by the National Rifle Association of America (NRA) to represent the NRA's Institute for Legislative Action and NRA Political Victory Fund. In 1983, Ricker moved to the west coast, where he organized and developed the California Wildlife Federation's legislative advocacy program. That same year, he led the legislative effort in California to pass the nation's first firearm industry product liability immunity statute.

== Controversy ==
In 1999, Ricker was appointed the executive director of the American Shooting Sports Council, a gun industry group. His time in that position was brief, as he lost his post as executive director after attending a meeting with President Clinton to discuss preventing school shooting like the Columbine High School massacre. The meeting, which was opposed by the National Rifle Association, led to the American Shooting Sports Council being disbanded.

In high-profile litigation brought by several major U.S. cities, Ricker gained national prominence when he went on record against the very industry he used to represent. In an affidavit filed in California, and later in testimony before a federal court in Brooklyn, New York, Ricker, pointed to what he said were "irresponsible" and "negligent" behavior on the part of gun manufacturers, distributors and dealers.

== Later work ==
Ricker managed his own Sacramento, California based legislative advocacy and policy consulting firm.

Ricker died December 4, 2009.

== See also ==
- Right to keep and bear arms
- Gun politics
