= Harold Ickes =

Harold Ickes may refer to:

- Harold L. Ickes (1874–1952), U.S. Secretary of the Interior in Franklin D. Roosevelt's administration
- Harold M. Ickes (born 1939), son of the U.S. Interior Secretary, deputy White House Chief of Staff during the administration of U.S. President Bill Clinton
