= Holy Child Public School =

Location
- Sector 29, 75 Faridabad; India
- 28.434°N 77.323°E

Information
- Established: 1976
- School district: Faridabad
- Principal: Ms. Anshoo Tandon
- Website: holychildfaridabad.com

Holy Child Public School is a school in Sector 29, Faridabad, Haryana.

Holy Child Public School is a co-educational English Medium Public School and provides education to all age group children from Pre-Nursery to Class XII. The school was established in 1976 and is managed by Holy Child Educational Society (Regd.) with chairman Capt. R.K. Bhatia. It is affiliated to the Central Board of Secondary Education (CBSE) and follows the national syllabus as approved by the National Council of Education, Research and Training (NCERT).
