= The Modern School, Faridabad =

Private co-educational school in Faridabad, Haryana, India

Location
- BPTP, Park Lands, Sector 85; Greater Faridabad, Haryana, 121002; India
- Coordinates: 28.4031703°N 77.3502858°E

Information
- Type: Private school
- Established: 1920
- Founder: Lala Raghubir Singh
- Sister school: Modern School (New Delhi); Modern School, Kundli
- School board: Central Board of Secondary Education
- Principal: Dr Shivani Sahni
- Grades: Play Group–12
- Gender: Co-educational
- Age range: 2–18
- Website: www.modernschoolfbd.com

The Modern School, Faridabad is a private co-educational school in Faridabad, Haryana, India. It was established in 1920 by Lala Raghubir Singh and is affiliated to the Central Board of Secondary Education. It has expanded by opening new branches in the National Capital Region of Delhi.

== History ==
=== Origins ===
Modern School was founded by Lala Raghubir Singh, an established and a well to do resident of Delhi. He belonged to a Rajput family but later converted to Jainism and settled in Delhi. His father, Sultan Singh, was an accountant and banker (khazanchi) with the Imperial Bank of India, and was well-regarded by both the British rulers and the Indian princes. In fact, Sultan Singh bequeathed his sprawling mansion with extensive grounds in Daryaganj for the purpose of establishing Modern School.

Modern School was started in 1920 in a building located in Daryaganj, New Delhi. It was a mansion that belonged to Rai Bahadur Lala Sultan Singh. He donated it to the school to fulfill his son's dream of establishing a school which would combine the traditions of Indian education with modern educational techniques. Sultan Singh was a prominent businessman in British India in the early 1880s. His son, Lala Raghubir Singh, was the brain behind founding of the school.

=== Founder ===
Lala Raghubir Singh was the primary founder, he worked for the improvement of the school and in this endeavour he teamed up with Sardar Sobha Singh. Sardar Sobha Singh was the co-founder of the school. A builder during the height of the Raj, he was involved in the construction of buildings in Delhi like Connaught Place, National Museum, Modern School, South Block and India Gate. His own two sons, Bhagwant Singh and Khushwant Singh (the noted writer) were amongst the first students of Modern School.
