= Faridabad Model School =

Location
- Faridabad; India; 28.4376093°N 77.0466335°E

Information
- Established: 1978
- Founder: Late Sh. C.B Malik Ji.
- Chairman: Rtn. H.S Malik
- Director: Mr. Umang Malik
- Principal: Mrs. ShashiBala
- Website: www.fmsschools.com
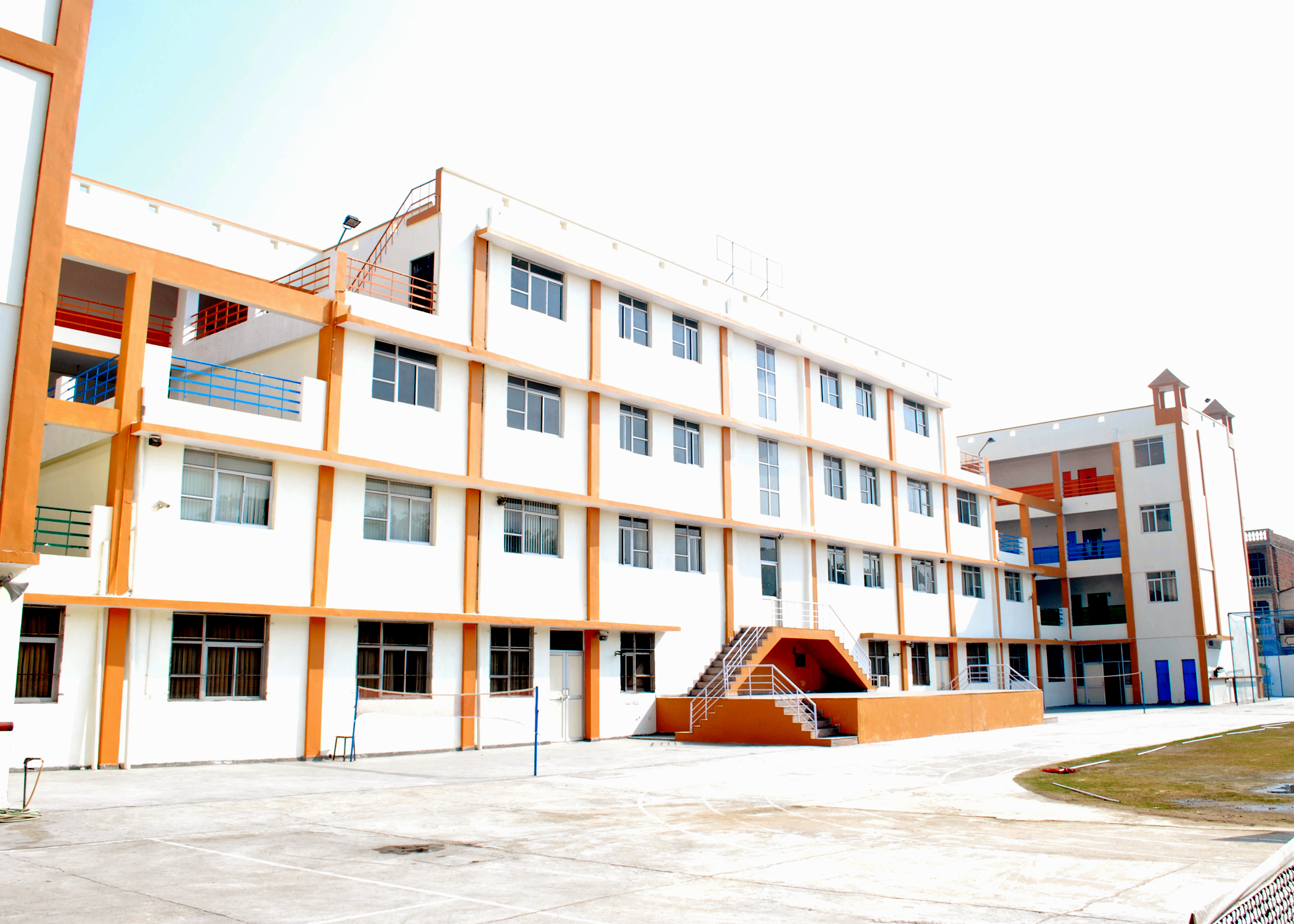
- Faridabad Model School

Faridabad Model School is a school in Faridabad, Haryana, India.

The school is located in Sector-31, Faridabad adjacent to National Highway 2 (Delhi–Mathura Road). Faridabad Model School is affiliated with the Central Board of Secondary Education, New Delhi up to Class XII.

== See also ==
- Education in India
- Literacy in India
- List of institutions of higher education in Haryana
