= Peter Eich =

German footballer (born 1963)

Personal information
- Date of birth: 18 June 1963 (age 63)
- Place of birth: Bad Kreuznach, West Germany
- Height: 1.83 m (6 ft 0 in)
- Position: Goalkeeper

Youth career
- TuS Rheinböllen
- –1984: TuS Dichtelbach
- 1984–1990: Hassia Bingen

Senior career*
Years	Team	Apps	(Gls)
1990–1992	Waldhof Mannheim	23	(0)
1992–1998	FC Homburg	184	(0)
1998–2007	1. FC Saarbrücken	248	(0)
Total		455	(0)
- * Club domestic league appearances and goals

Peter Eich (born 18 June 1963) is a German former professional footballer who played as a goalkeeper for Waldhof Mannheim, FC Homburg and 1. FC Saarbrücken.
