= Prodosh Aich =

Indian academic

Dr. Prodosh Aich (born 1933) is a retired Bengali-Indian professor, formerly of the University of Oldenburg, and the author of several books.

He is chiefly known for his German language publication Lies With Long Legs, (Lügen mit langen Beinen), that questions the foundations and veracity of Indology, Indologists, Aryans, Sanskrit, Hinduism, Indo-European-language families and race along with many more.

== Biography ==
He was born in 1933 in Calcutta (now Kolkata), India. He did his high school and philosophical studies in India, and studied sociology, ethnology, and philosophy at the University of Cologne in Germany. He also taught sociology at the University of Rajasthan, University of Cologne and Oldenburg University.

He has published many essays and papers in readers and journals and made several documentary films as well as authored several books.

== Bibliography ==
- Truths - European Christians in History in 2015
- Lies With Long Legs — Discoveries, Scholars, Science, Enlightenment Documentary Narration (Lügen mit langen Beinen, German) in 2003.
- Thorns on a Righteous Path (Preis des aufrechten Gangs, German) in 2001.
- Coloured amongst whites (Farbige unter Weissen, German) in 1962.
