= 2016 Munich shooting =

Mass shooting in Munich, Germany

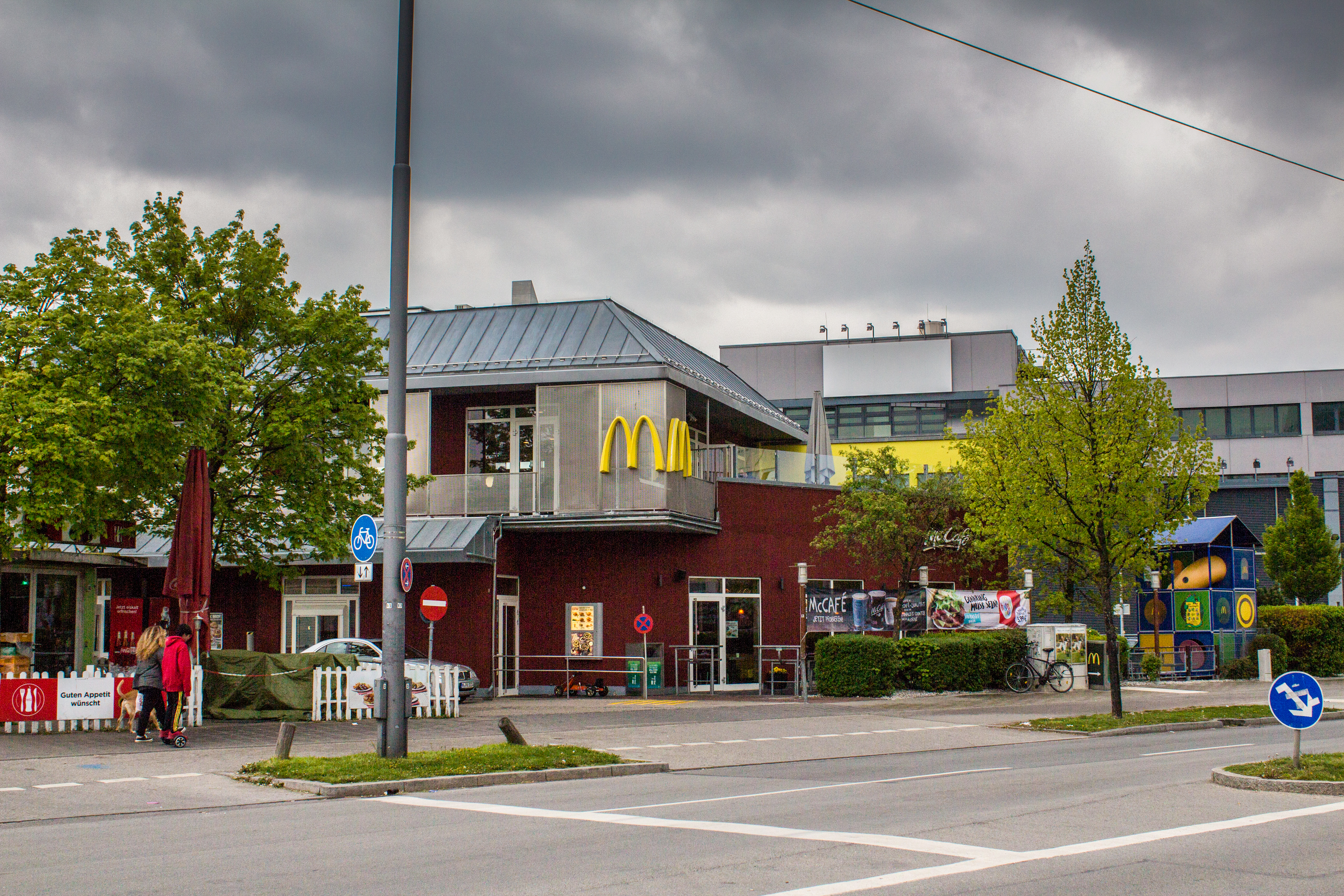
- Outside the McDonald's on Hanauer Straße 83, looking northwest, where the shooting began

- Munich (Bavaria) Munich (Germany)
- Location: 48°11′0″N 11°32′1″E; Moosach, Munich, Germany
- Date: 22 July 2016; 10 years ago 17:52 – 20:26 (UTC+2)
- Target: Civilians
- Attack type: Mass shooting, mass murder, murder–suicide
- Weapon: 9mm Glock 17 semi-automatic pistol
- Deaths: 10 (including the perpetrator)
- Injuries: 36 (4 by gunfire)
- Perpetrator: David Sonboly (born Ali Sonboly)
- Motive: Revenge for bullying Far-right extremism

On 22 July 2016, a mass shooting classified as a right-wing extremist attack occurred in the vicinity of the Olympia shopping mall in the Moosach district of Munich, Germany. The perpetrator, 18-year-old Iranian-German David Sonboly, opened fire on teenagers with migrant background at a McDonald's restaurant before shooting at bystanders in the street outside and then in the mall itself. Nine people were killed – most of them with immigrant backgrounds – and 36 others were injured, four of them by gunfire.

Sonboly, who had been influenced by far-right ideology, xenophobia, and racist beliefs, hid nearby for more than two hours and killed himself by a self-inflicted gunshot wound when confronted by police. Later investigations determined that the attack was politically motivated and driven by right-wing extremist views.

Two reports by Bavaria's State Office of Criminal Investigation and another by the public prosecutor's office concluded the shooting was not political, saying Sonboly's main motive was "revenge" for bullying by others from immigrant backgrounds, and that mental illness, romantic rejection and obsession with other shooting rampages were also a factor. Germany's security agency described him as a "psychologically ill avenger".

An independent report by three political scientists said Sonboly may also have been driven by xenophobia or far-right ideology. Der Spiegel reported in 2016 that fellow online video gamers said that Sonboly wrote anti-Turkish messages, admired Germany's right-wing AfD party, and was "very nationalistic". According to media reports, some of those who knew him said he considered himself part of the Aryan race, and boasted about sharing the same birthday as Adolf Hitler. In the light of this, several politicians urged the police to focus on his possible political motives and in 2019 Bavarian police declared that the shooting was partly motivated by far-right extremism. The attack took place on the fifth anniversary of the 2011 Norway attacks.

== Incident ==
On the evening of 22 July 2016, David Sonboly opened fire at a McDonald's restaurant near the Olympia shopping mall in the Moosach district of Munich. Despite initial reports of multiple attack sites, police could not confirm attacks in any locations other than the shopping area.

Sonboly had made a fake Facebook account with a girl's name and posted four invitations to come to the restaurant, but "none of the addressees apparently complied". He stayed in the restaurant from about 5pm. At about 5:50pm, he went into the restaurant's toilets on the first floor, and left a manifesto on his laptop. About eight minutes later he left the toilets and opened fire on a group of six teenagers sitting at a table, killing five and wounding another, using a handgun he had taken from his backpack. Eighteen bullets were fired. He immediately left the restaurant, turned to the right and began shooting at people fleeing towards an electronics shop and at two vehicles parked there. He fired sixteen bullets in this area, killing three people and wounding three others. Sonboly then crossed Hanauer Strasse and slowly walked into the shopping mall, where he fatally shot another teenager near the lifts.

At about 6:00pm, Sonboly walked from the shopping mall, over a covered footbridge to the adjoining multi-storey car park. While on this bridge, he fired shots towards the parking deck and a passer-by, but hurt no one. He fired thirteen rounds at two unoccupied parked vehicles and walked onto the top parking deck. There, Sonboly had an argument with a man who shouted at him from the balcony of his flat. During this argument, Sonboly fired two shots at the man. Another man, who was also on his balcony, was wounded by ricocheting bullet fragments. Sonboly fired three more times towards the mall and towards an employee, without hurting anyone. Police officers spotted the gunman from an outdoor balcony of the mall, and one officer fired a shot from a submachine gun at him, but missed.

Sonboly ran across Riesstrasse and hid in a residential area. He tried to get into a house, and lingered in a stairwell, where he had contact with residents. He then hid in a bicycle storage room. At 18:26, he went outside and was confronted by police officers, whereupon he fatally shot himself in the head.

=== Early reports and videos ===
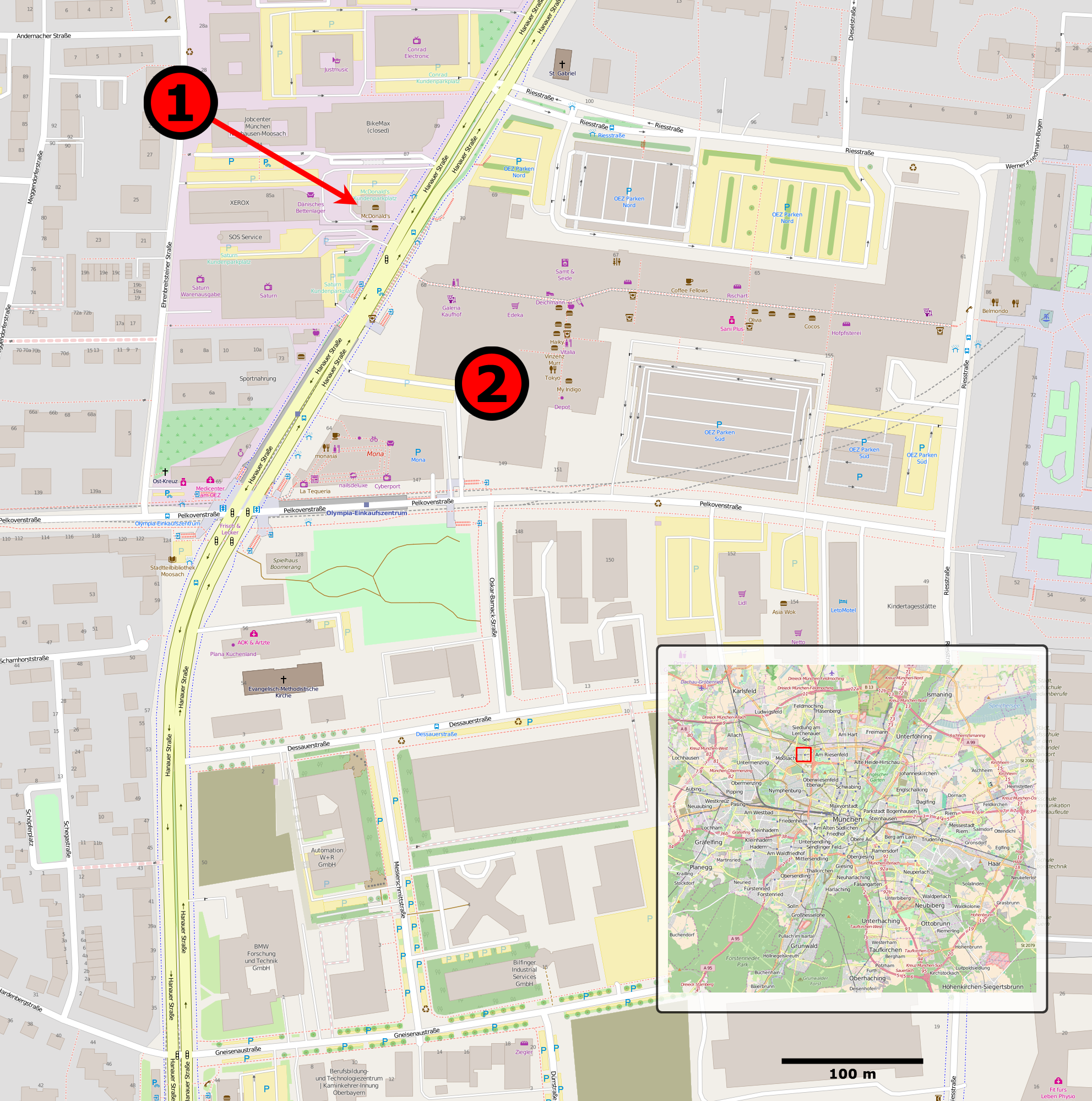
Map of shooting: (1) McDonald's, where the shooting started (2) Olympia shopping mall

An early witness, identified only by her first name Lauretta, in talking to CNN correspondent Doug McConnell on the phone claimed that the gunman had shouted "Allahu Akbar!" The woman's account has not been verified by other witnesses or the police, though it was widely disseminated in the media.

A video distributed online showed a gunman firing at pedestrians outside McDonald's. He then moved on to the shopping mall itself. Another video showed the gunman walking alone on the roof of a nearby car park before opening fire again. He was heard shouting "I am German" (Ich bin Deutscher) and "I was born here" (Ich bin hier geboren) after an onlooker shouted anti-Turkish statements and other abuse at him. According to Frankfurter Allgemeine Zeitung, the gunman also shouted back "Fucking Turks". However, it is still not clear who started the anti-Turkish insults.

=== Authorities' response ===
An urgent warning was issued to avoid the Karlsplatz ("Stachus"), due to reports of multiple shootings occurring there. Munich police had received information about an attack at Karlsplatz, but after arriving there, announced that the information was false. Drivers were advised not to pick up any passengers. People in Munich were warned by the police to stay at home and avoid crowds and public squares.

Following initial reports of shots being fired, some 2,300 officers were deployed throughout Munich from the greater area and surrounding states. A manhunt was soon initiated. Munich police urged residents not to leave their homes until further notice. The special operations police unit GSG 9 was deployed. Other regions of Germany, Austria, and Switzerland were asked to assist in the investigation. A backpack was found apparently matching the one carried by the gunman at McDonald's. Police reportedly used a robot to examine it, and a total of 300 rounds of ammunition were found inside. Police officials warned of "an acute terror situation" and initially thought that there were up to three attackers, but later confirmed that there was only one gunman.

The Munich U-Bahn, tram service, bus service, and services on the central portion of the S-Bahn in Munich were stopped. Munich main station was evacuated and all trains were cancelled in and out of Munich. Regional and inter-city trains ceased their service to and from the region of the shooting. Deutsche Bahn provided accommodation trains for stranded commuters and tourists where they could seek refuge. These were located at Mammendorf, Starnberg, Geltendorf, Dachau, and Freising.

== Casualties ==
Nine victims and the perpetrator died in the incident; 16 others were injured, four by gunshot. Three of the dead were female, and six were male. Seven of the dead were Muslims. Three of the victims were Turkish, two victims were from German Sinti families and one was from a Kosovan Roma family.

- Sevda Dağ, 45, Turkish
- Hüseyin Dayıcık, 19, born in Germany of Greek parents
- Selçuk Kiliç, 15, Turkish
- Giuliano Kollmann, 18, German of Romanian origin
- Can Leyla, 14, Turkish
- Roberto Rafael, 15, Hungarian
- Armela Segashi, 14, Kosovan
- Sabina Sulaj, 14, Kosovan
- Dijamant Zabergja, 20 or 21, of Kosovan heritage

There were claims that Sonboly deliberately targeted people of Turkish or Arab origin, groups he apparently felt had picked on him at school. The state government initially said the victims were not chosen in any particular way and that Sonboly did not know any of them. Police initially considered it a coincidence that all of the fatalities were of immigrant backgrounds; they suggested this may be because the McDonald's was frequented by the children of immigrants.

In preparation for admitting the injured, multiple hospitals called their medical staff in to work outside normal working hours. A state of emergency was declared at the Rechts der Isar Hospital, where one of the injured victims died.

== Investigation ==
Munich police chief Hubertus Andrä said that the shooting appeared to be a "classic shooting rampage" and not terrorism. Police said that the gunman was obsessed with mass shootings and that written material on such attacks was found in his room. Prosecutor Steinkraus Koch said that the gunman had a book about school shootings called Why Kids Kill: Inside the Minds of School Shooters by Peter F. Langman. No references to religion were found in documents in his home. Andrä said that there was an "obvious" link between the shooting and the fifth anniversary of the 2011 Norway attacks committed by Anders Behring Breivik. However, a police search of the shooter's residence did not find the manifesto written and distributed by Breivik. According to Abendzeitung, the shooter's own manifesto was found on his computer's hard disk.

Police investigator Robert Heimberger said that the shooter appeared to have hacked a girl's Facebook account in an attempt to lure people to McDonald's with an offer of free food, but it was later suspected that he had in fact simply created a fake Facebook account, not hacked an existing one.

Authorities said that the gunman had been planning the shooting for a year and probably purchased his gun illegally on the darknet. It was said to be a "reactivated" Glock 17 9mm semi-automatic pistol that previously had been used as a theatre prop. German police believe that the gun may have originated in Slovakia, and said that its serial number had been removed.

On 25 July 2016, Munich police announced the arrest of a 16-year-old Afghan friend of the perpetrator who was being investigated on suspicion of failing to report the gunman's plans.

Nearly two years after the shooting, police opened an investigation into Sonboly's contact with William Atchison, perpetrator of the 2017 Aztec High School shooting, and with a boy in Gerlingen who planned a school shooting there. Shortly after the Munich shooting, Atchison wrote an epitaph to Sonboly on Encyclopedia Dramatica, calling him a "true Aryan" and "true German".

== Perpetrator ==
David Sonboly (born Ali Sonboly; 20 April 1998 – 22 July 2016) was an 18-year-old Iranian-German with dual nationality. The Munich Police Department said Sonboly was born and raised in Munich and had no criminal record. He lived in an apartment in the neighbourhood of Maxvorstadt with his parents and younger brother. He grew up in a secular household, according to his neighbours. He had a part-time job distributing a local free newspaper. Neighbours described him as a "polite boy".

German Interior Minister Thomas de Maizière said that he was the son of Shiite Muslims from Iran who came to Germany as asylum seekers in the 1990s. Sonboly's parents told police that their son had possibly converted to Christianity, but that he was not religious. In May 2016, Sonboly had his first name changed in all official documents from Ali to David.

=== Possible motives ===
The shooting was initially theorized to be linked to Islamic extremism, as one report said he said "Allahu akbar" but was proven false.

The report by the Bavarian State Office of Criminal Investigation and public prosecutor's office in March 2017 concluded that the shooting was not political, saying that Sonboly's main motive was "revenge" for bullying, and that his mental illness and obsession with other shooting rampages were also a factor. The Federal Office for the Protection of the Constitution, Germany's security agency, also believed he was a "psychologically ill avenger" rather than a terrorist.

Sonboly had undergone psychiatric treatment for depression, anxiety and post-traumatic stress disorder. In 2015, he had been treated for two months as an inpatient in a mental care facility. He was largely isolated from his peers and suffered years of bullying by classmates, which included physical abuse. A former classmate recalled, "We always "mobbed" [sic] him in school, and he always told us that he would kill us". He developed a hatred for those of a similar age and background as those who bullied him, mainly Turks and Albanians. He developed an "irrational worldview" in which he believed that the people he hated were infected with a virus and must be exterminated. On the day of the shooting, Sonboly saved a document on his computer in which he wrote "The bullying will be paid back today". During the shooting itself, he shouted that he had been bullied for seven years.

Sonboly had an obsession with mass shootings and rampage killers; he compiled a scrapbook of news clippings on mass shootings and owned several books on the subject. During his psychiatric treatment he repeatedly told fellow patients to refer to him as the 'Spree Killer'. One incident that fascinated him was the Winnenden school shooting, and he visited Winnenden and took pictures there. Sonboly was also fascinated by the 2011 Norway attacks perpetrated by Norwegian terrorist Anders Behring Breivik, and Sonboly's shooting was on its fifth anniversary.

Sonboly voiced xenophobic views and support for the far-right. Der Spiegel reported that fellow online video gamers said that Sonboly wrote anti-Turkish messages, admired Germany's right-wing AfD party, and was "very nationalistic". According to media reports, some of those who knew him said he considered himself part of the Aryan race, and boasted about sharing the same birthday as Adolf Hitler. In light of this, several politicians urged the police to focus on his possible political motives. In October 2017, a panel of three political scientists commissioned by Munich City Council concluded that Sonboly's shooting was partially driven by xenophobia and far-right ideology. Investigators, however, argued that his xenophobia stemmed from being bullied by other immigrants.

The Bavarian State Office of Criminal Investigation commissioned another report into Sonboly's motives. In 2018, it concluded that the incident was a non-political shooting rampage driven by bullying, romantic rejection, and obsession with other mass shootings. In October 2019, it was announced by the Bavarian police that the shooting was instead classified as a "politically motivated crime" that "was at least partly motivated by the right-wing extremist views of the perpetrator".

== Reactions ==
=== Domestic ===
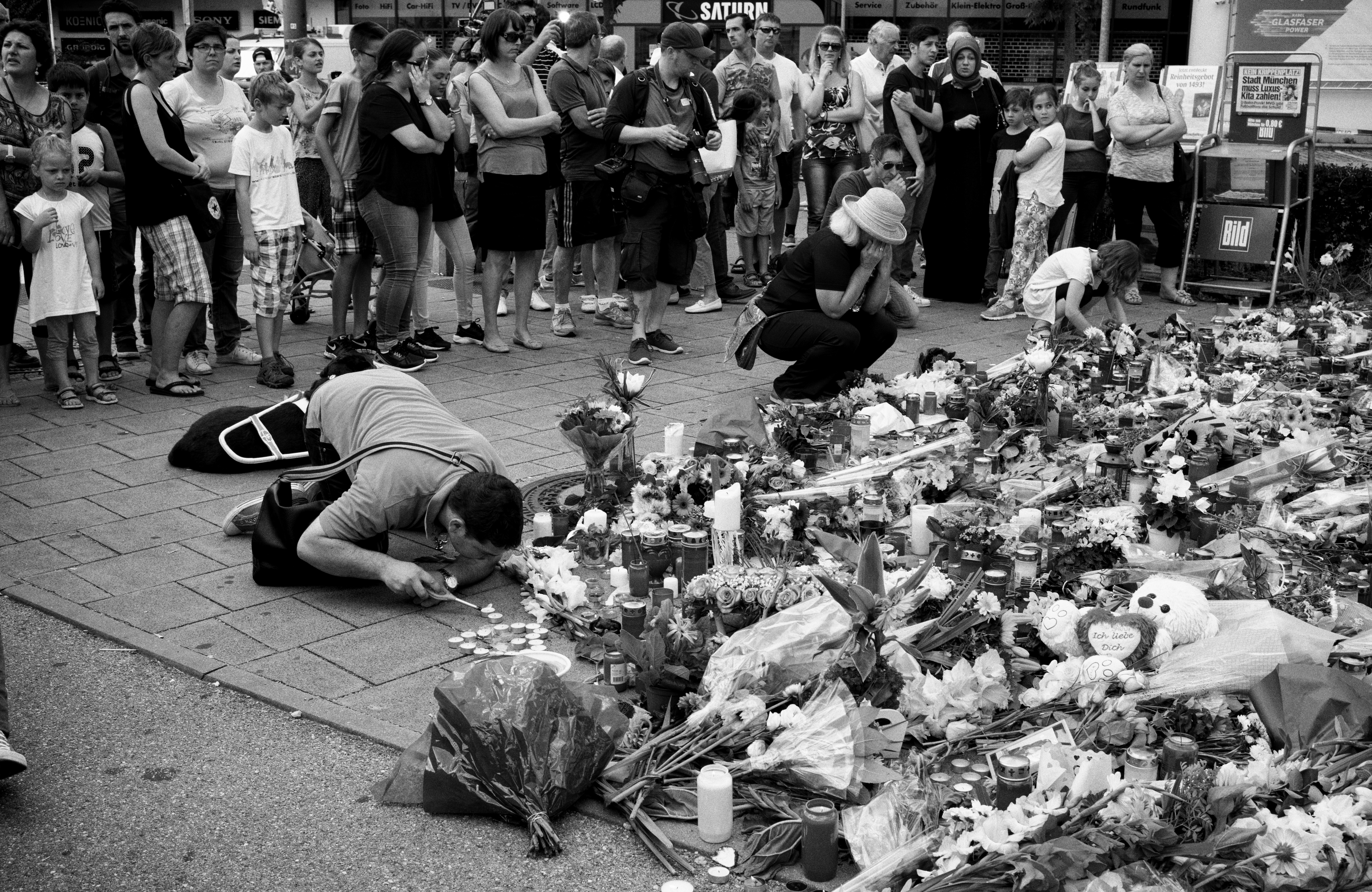
Flowers laid at the mall after the shooting

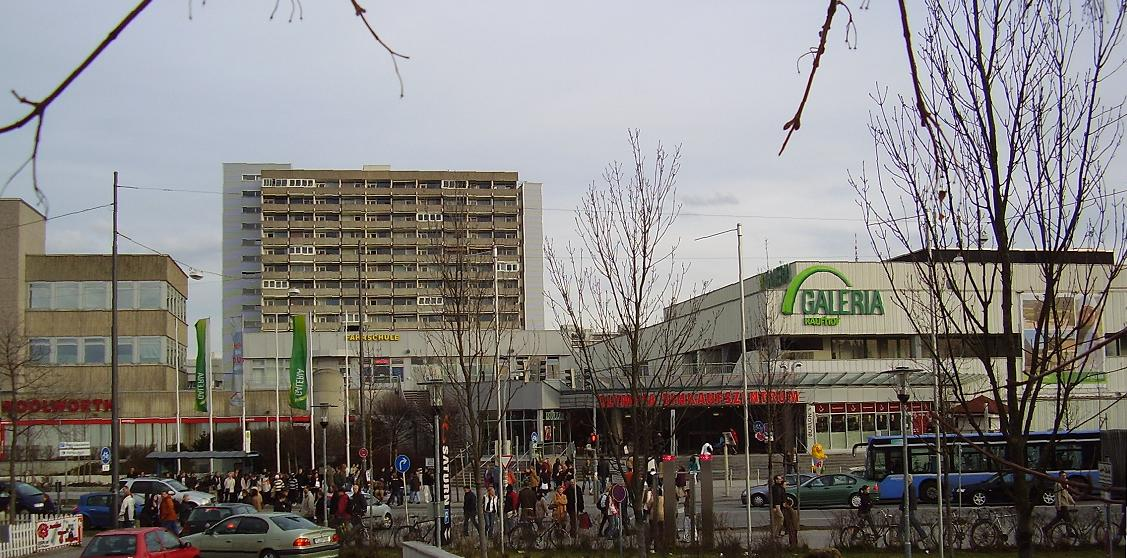
Olympia shopping mall (Olympia-Einkaufszentrum or OEZ) as seen in 2007

The Bavarian State Police urged the public not to publish online any photos or videos of the shooting. They provided a special upload platform which allowed witnesses to upload photos, audio, or video recordings directly in order to assist the investigation. Munich residents also used the Twitter hashtag #offeneTür (open door) to tell people in need of shelter where they could go.

German Chancellor Angela Merkel addressed the victims' families in a press conference on 23 July by saying, "We suffer with you." She thanked the Munich residents who opened their doors for stranded people. The Minister-President of Bavaria, Horst Seehofer, urged extreme caution against drawing premature conclusions and noted that optimisation of the security forces had to be considered. He said that he had spent more than four hours in the operations centre on 22 July, and thanked the forces for acting with professionalism and calm. The Interior Minister of Bavaria, Joachim Herrmann, announced an investigation into why there had been numerous false alarms.

The German Depression-Help Trust (Stiftung Deutsche Depressionshilfe) warned of stigmatizing mentally ill people in reaction to the shooting.

After the shooter was revealed to have been born in Germany, the right-wing politician André Poggenburg was condemned and mocked in German media for having previously blamed Merkel's open refugee policy for the shooting.

=== International ===
The U.S. Department of State warned Americans in Munich to "shelter in place". President Barack Obama said in a statement that he pledged support for those affected by the shooting.

Czech Interior Minister Milan Chovanec said his country would reinforce its borders to prevent the perpetrator(s) from fleeing into that country, according to German television station n-tv. The Czech Foreign Ministry set up an emergency hotline and urged Czechs to avoid public places.

The Iranian Ministry of Foreign Affairs condemned the attack. The Ministry's spokesperson, Bahram Ghassemi, expressed condolences to the German government and nation, saying, "The killing of innocent and defenseless civilians has marked another blot on the human history".

Greek Prime Minister Alexis Tsipras said that having a Greek citizen among the dead "binds us even more to the fight to eradicate hatred and terrorism in Europe".

== See also ==
- 1984 San Ysidro McDonald's massacre
- 2009 Winnenden shootings
- 2006 Emsdetten school shooting
- Erfurt school massacre
