= Moosach (disambiguation) =

Moosach is a municipality in Upper Bavaria, Germany.

Moosach may also refer to several other places or rivers in Germany:

- Moosach (Munich), a neighbourhood of the city of Munich
- Munich Moosach station, a station on the Munich S-Bahn also leading to the Munich U-Bahn and the tramway network
- Moosach (river), a tributary of the Isar
