= Hanauer Straße =

Street in Munich, Germany

Coordinates: 48.18092°N 11.52907°E

Hanauer Straße in Munich is an arterial road about one and a half kilometers long extending from south to north in the Moosach district. It was named after the Hesse city of Hanau.

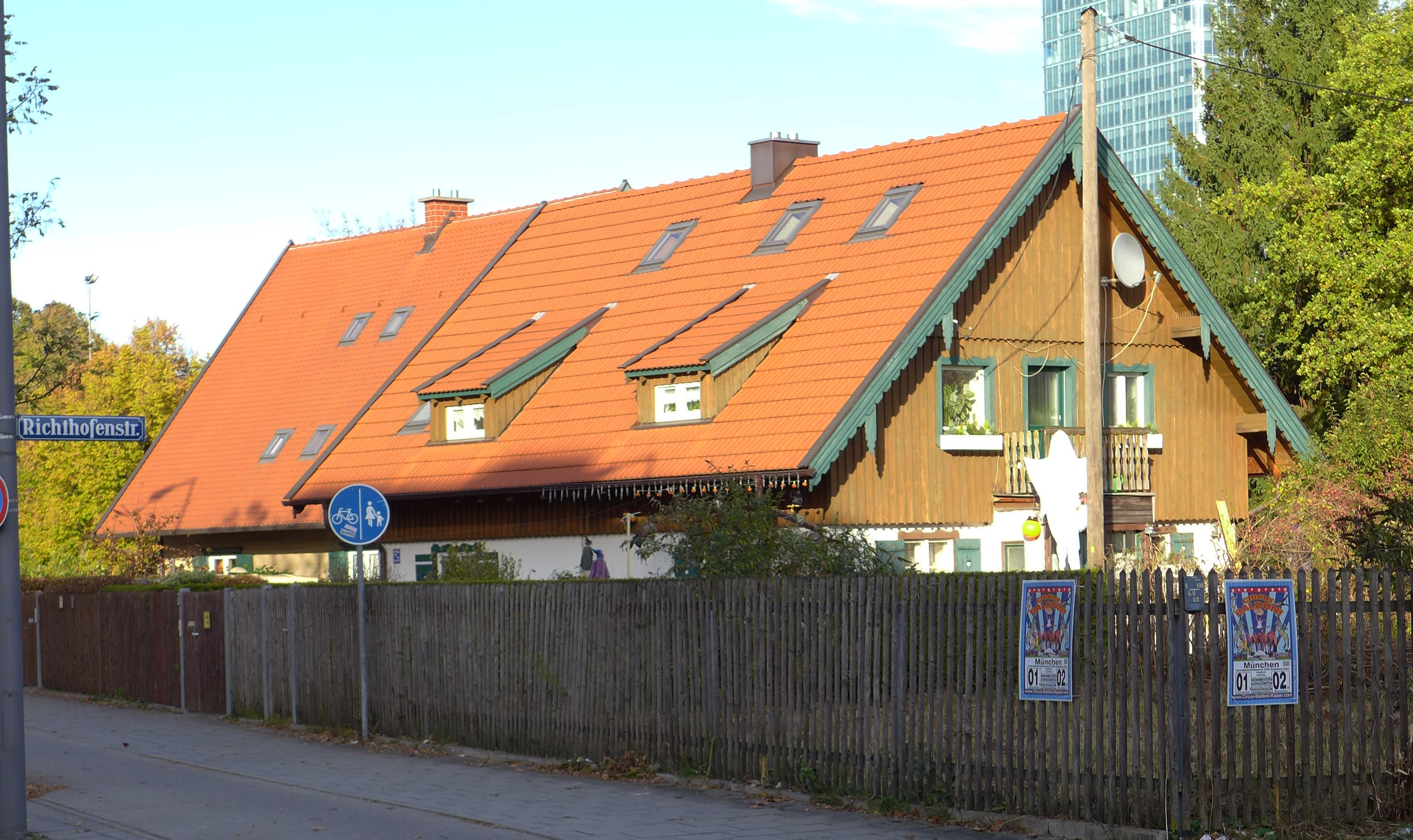
Hanauer Straße 10

== Geographical location ==
Hanauer Straße branches from Dachauer Straße, opposite the Westfriedhof, as an extension of the Orpheusstraße to the north. It crosses the Georg-Brauchle-Ring after about 400 meters. After crossing this road, it connects to the Lassallestraße.

== Development ==
=== Former development ===
The area of the Moosach gasworks of Stadtwerke München extended between Hanauer Straße, Georg-Brauchle-Ring and the Borstei. Here, between 23 April 1909 and 20 March 1967, the town gas was generated through gasification of hard coal. During this time around 15 million tonnes of coal were processed. It also produced about 500,000 tonnes of tar and tar oil as by-products. Until 1975, the site was further used for gas processing before the plant was shut down.

A large part of the area was contaminated by tar and tar oil, which had seeped underground during the period in which the gas works operated. After many years vacant, the demolition of the buildings took place in 1992. Since mid-2005, Europe's largest funnel-and-gate system, a passive cleaning process, has been in operation there. The plant is designed for over 350 m^{3} / h of water, which is loaded with polycyclic aromatic hydrocarbons (PAH).

Hanauer Straße was the location of the Olympic press city in 1972.

=== Current development ===
At Hanauer Straße 10/10a, 12/12a and 14/14a, the Lehrkolonie Moosach (teaching colony) was built in 1919 by the Bayerische Landessiedlung. Three semi-detached houses, single-family small-house buildings in country house style, served as experimental buildings for the testing of alternative building materials. Today these buildings are cultural monuments under the Bavarian monument protection law.

At Hanauer Straße 54, stands the Evangelical Methodist Church of the Redeemer; the Moosach town library is at Hanauer Straße 61a.

The area to the north of Pelkovenstraße is one of Bavaria's major retail centers, characterized by commercial enterprises and multi-storey residential buildings: east of the city, the Mona (7,700 m^{2} retail space) and the Olympia-Einkaufszentrum (Olympia shopping center] (56,000 m^{2} retail space) border Hanauer Straße. Across the street are more retail spaces, each with sales floorspace of several thousand square meters (for example Conrad Electronic and Saturn Hansa stores, a furniture store and a medical center).

=== Future development ===
East of the southern part of Hanauer Straße a bus depot and a six-storey office building are being built on the site of the former gasworks. To the south of this is a neighborhood with about 600 apartments for 1,350 people, two day-care centers and a primary school. This is then grouped around the buildings of the Lehrkolonie Moosach.

== Public transport ==
Located on Hanauer Straße are the underground stations Georg-Brauchle-Ring (U1) and Olympia-Einkaufszentrum (U1/U3), at the junction with the Dachauer Straße the tram stop Hanauer Straße tram line 20/N20.

== Events ==
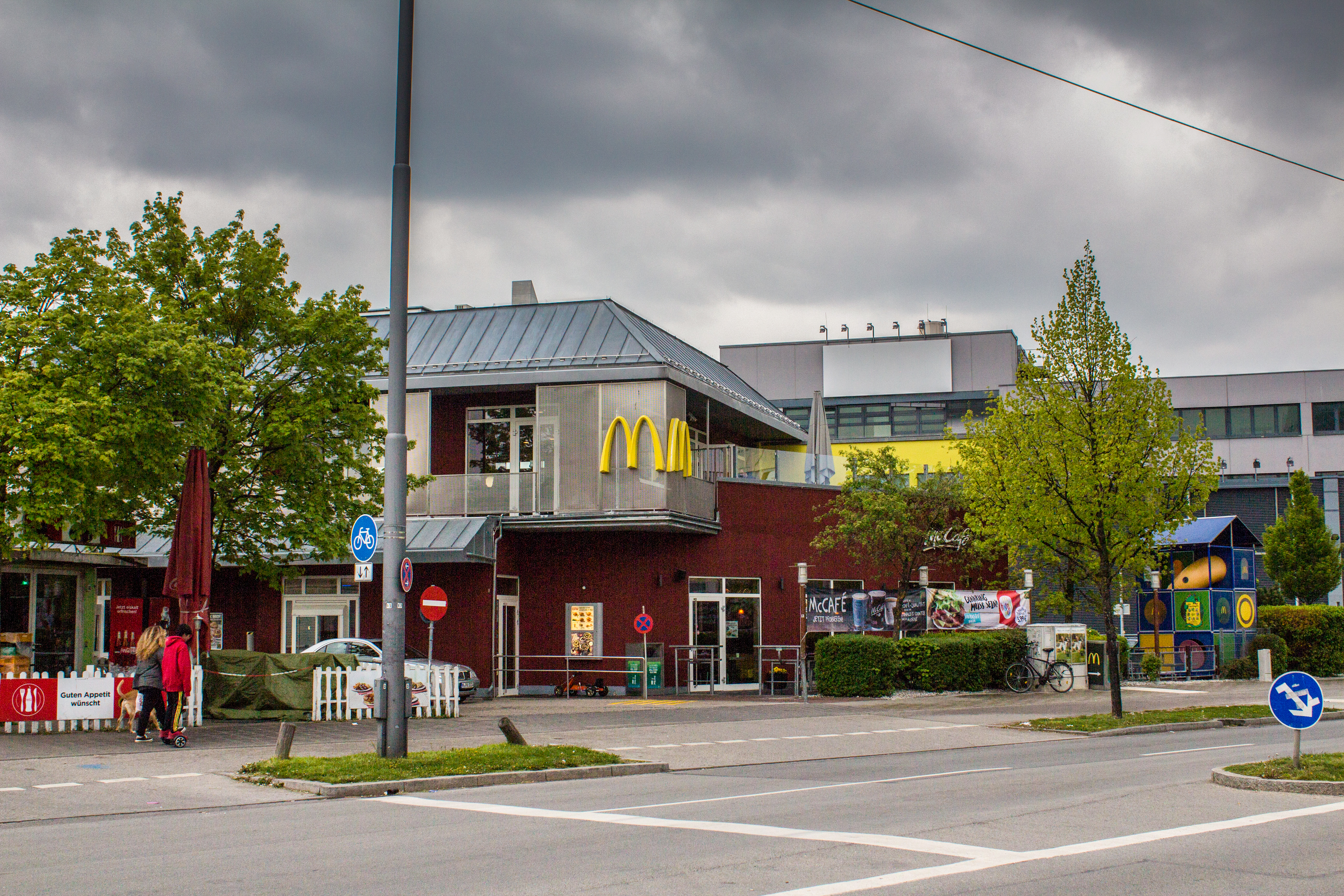
Scene of the attack

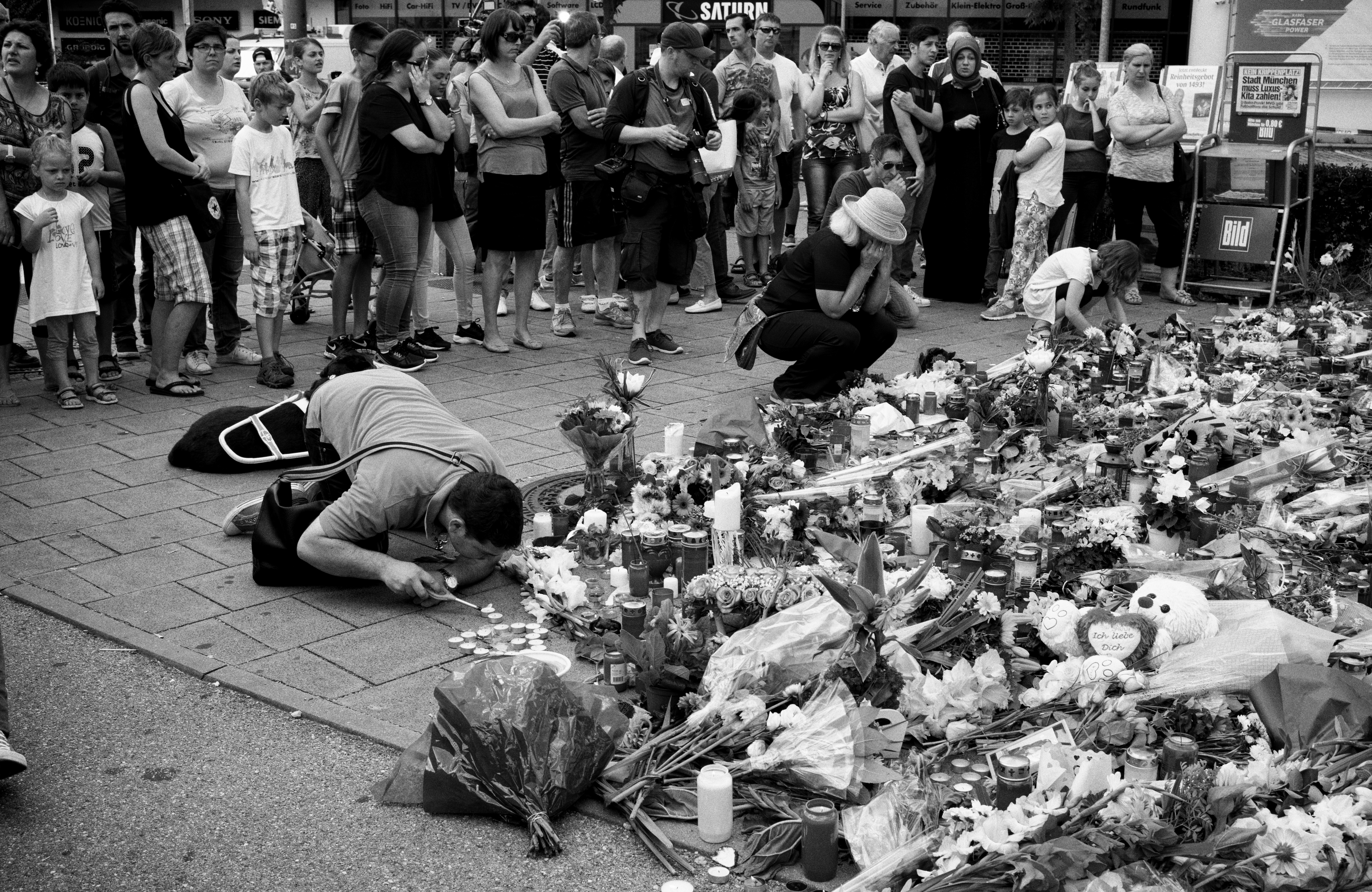
Flower laying

The Hanauer Straße was the main location of an attack in Munich on 22 July 2016. Five people died in a McDonald's restaurant, two more on the sidewalk in front of the restaurant and another in close proximity. The perpetrator crossed Hanauer Straße and killed another man on the east side of Hanauer Straße in the Olympia shopping center. At number 77, the top of Hanauer Straße, between McDonald's and Saturn, a memorial is to be inaugurated for the first anniversary of the act: A ten-meter-high ginkgo tree is covered by a two-meter-high and 2.5-meter-wide ring of polished stainless steel, part of the ring is sunk in the ground and allows entry. Visually, the monument resembles a friendship or wedding ring, the outside of which adorns the inscription "In Memory of All Victims of the Rampage of 22 July 2016". Each gem is dedicated to one of the victims, inside are the names. The lighting is recessed into the floor, allowing the ring to reflect in the dark. The work of art Für Euch (especially for you) was designed by Elke Härtel and won a design competition organized by the city council.
