= 2017 Aztec High School shooting =

School shooting in Aztec, New Mexico

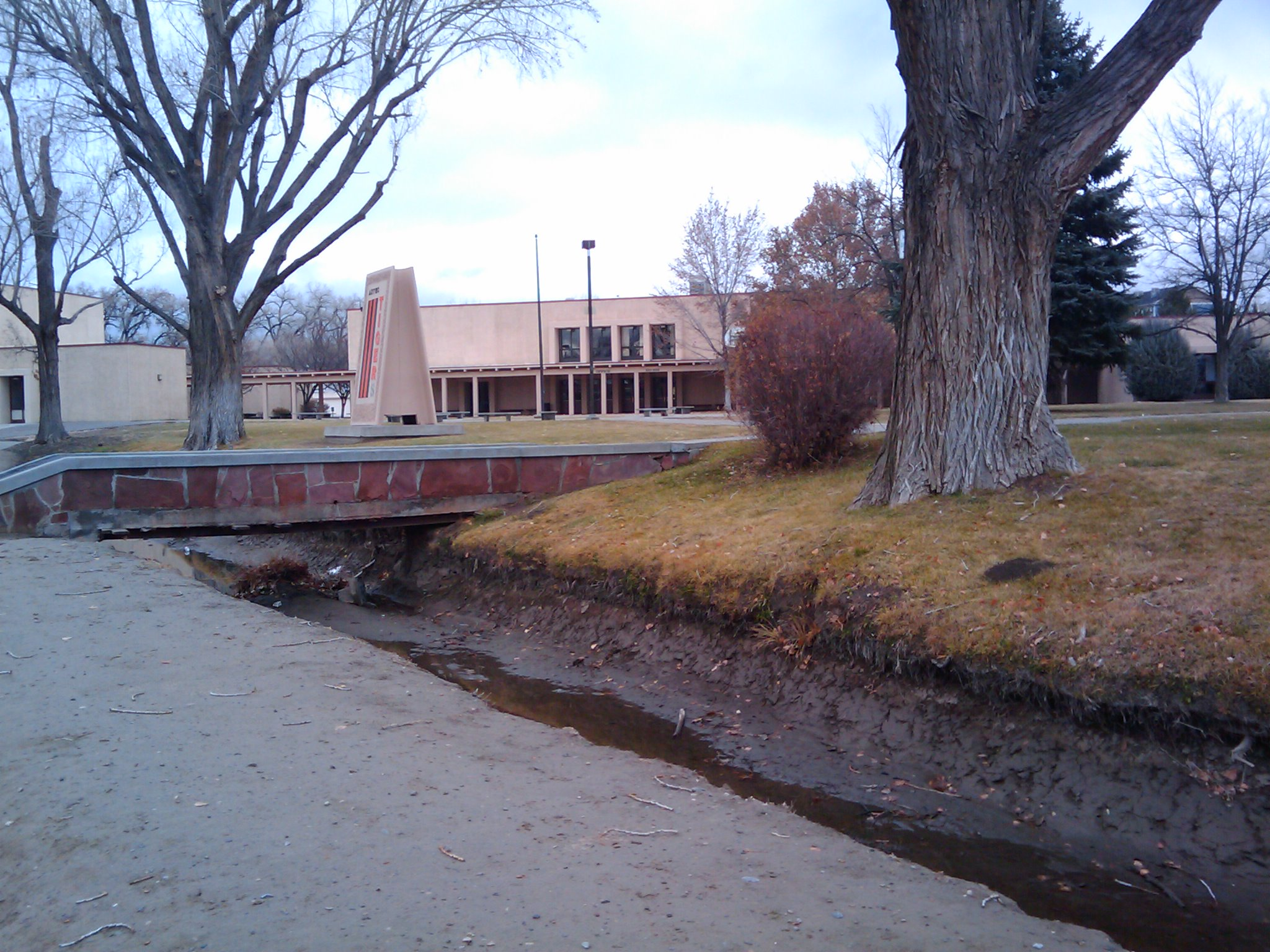
- Aztec High School in 2008

- Aztec High School (New Mexico) Aztec High School (the United States)
- Location: 36°49′15″N 107°59′26″W: Aztec High School; Aztec, New Mexico, U.S.
- Date: December 7, 2017; 8 years ago 8:04 – 8:16 a.m. (UTC−07:00)
- Target: Students and staff at Aztec High School
- Attack type: School shooting; murder-suicide
- Weapon: Glock pistol
- Deaths: 3 (including the perpetrator)
- Perpetrator: William Atchison
- Defender: Katie Potter
- Motive: Disputed

On December 7, 2017, a school shooting occurred at Aztec High School in Aztec, New Mexico, United States. The perpetrator, William Atchison, a 21-year-old former student, entered the school disguised as a student and hid in the school restroom. He was discovered by student Francisco Fernandez, whom he then shot and killed, before killing another student in the hallway. He attempted to enter a classroom, but a teacher barricaded the door with a couch, preventing him from entering. Atchison then killed himself.

Atchison was prolific online, including on neo-Nazi and white nationalist websites. In March 2016, he was investigated by the Federal Bureau of Investigation (FBI) for threatening to commit a mass shooting. The same year, he was in contact with the eventual perpetrator of the 2016 Munich shooting, who killed nine people in Germany later that year. The FBI dropped their investigation after they determined that Atchison, at the time he was investigated, did not own a firearm, and after he convinced them that his threats were merely "trolling". He bought the gun used in the shooting in November 2017.

The motive for the shooting is disputed, with the Southern Poverty Law Center arguing the shooting was motivated by far-right extremism and incel ideology, while the sheriff's office stated that there was no evidence the shooting was related to Atchison's views, instead arguing that he had personal problems and wanted to kill people for fame. After the shooting, the mother of one of the victims sued the FBI, the Aztec police, and the school district in two lawsuits for failing to prevent the attack; the lawsuit against the FBI was dismissed. The German police were separately criticized for failing to investigate the tie after the Munich shooting. The state of New Mexico authorized additional funding for school safety in response to the shooting.

== Background ==
Aztec is a small town in San Juan County, in northwest New Mexico near the Navajo Nation. The town is located in the heart of the San Juan Basin, which is known for its petroleum and natural gas deposits. Aztec is about three hours away by car, at a distance of approximately 180 miles (290 km) from Albuquerque, the most populous city in New Mexico. In 2017, the town had a population of about 6,500 people, with 900 students enrolled at Aztec High School. According to the United States Department of Education, in 2013, Aztec's student body was measured at 26% Hispanic and almost 20% Native American.

== Perpetrator ==
William Edward Atchison was born on March 18, 1996. He lived in Belen, New Mexico, before moving to Aztec with his family, and attending Aztec High School. According to his father, Atchison was bullied in school; in one incident, he was allegedly attacked during a welding class and stabbed in the chest. A neighbor called the Aztec police on Atchison twice, once for firing his airsoft pellet gun at their dogs, and a second time for threatening to shoot her husband during an argument over cannabis that had been found near the property. Because of these disputes, the neighbor refused to allow her sons to play with Atchison. She described him as someone who spent "a lot of time inside and alone", while a coworker said he was bullied.

Atchison was suspended from high school on March 9, 2012, for using the classroom whiteboard to write a chronology of the Columbine High School massacre. This complaint was not reported to the school's resource officer. Atchison had attended sessions with school counselors for many years and was seeing one regularly in Farmington until the counselor retired. He saw a new counselor two more times, but suddenly stopped before dropping out of school on August 20 of the same year. He never returned to school after the suspension. After leaving school, Atchison worked at a local Giant gas station near his home.

=== Online activity ===
Atchison was noted to have a substantial online presence, which The Daily Beast said resulted in him "making many enemies". His online activity included writing pro-Hitler and pro-Trump posts online and frequenting internet forums and white supremacist websites. He used various usernames, including "Future Mass Shooter" and names styled after several mass murderers. He was a sysop of Encyclopedia Dramatica, where he went by "AlGore", though he was sometimes criticized by its userbase. Other users would often ask Atchison "how his manifesto was going". His father later told investigators that he had noticed his son visiting "neo-Nazi" websites and believed they were a negative influence on him. He had few friends outside of the internet.

In an online posting written on the website Think Atheist in 2014, he described his frustration with life in rural New Mexico and his bleak career prospects and asked for advice on how to fix his life, saying: "Look, I'm sorry if I'm rude and hateful or anything, but I don't know what to do. I've lived no life for nearly 19 years [...] How can I become polite and make some friends out there in this world?" Though the post had several hundred views, no one responded. He was a white supremacist; he expressed an interest in mass shooters, Satan, and Hitler, and expressed antisemitic and misogynist sentiments. He also repeatedly posted about wanting to end his own life and called himself "mentally ill", saying he had "major depression, inability to feel joy, intense levels of sadistic desire and various addictions to substances", though other posts evidenced narcissistic thought.

In early 2016, Atchison began directly communicating with David Sonboly, who went on to commit a mass shooting in Munich in July of that year, killing nine and injuring 36 before he killed himself. Atchison and Sonboly had participated in a Steam chat group created by Atchison called the "Anti-Refugee Club". A member of the group claimed that the group "wasn't racist" but was "mostly satire", while political scientist Florian Hartleb described the group as a "virtual, international network of potential mass murderers". In the group, mass murderers like Anders Breivik were stylized as heroes, and group members shared fantasies of killing directed against "non-Aryans", people of color, migrants, Jews, and refugees. The group communicated about weapons and mass murder as well as multiplayer first-person shooter video games such as Counter-Strike. Another member of this group, a German 15-year-old, was introduced to Sonboly by Atchison. He was later arrested for plotting mass murder, and the investigation into him led to Atchison, but the Stuttgart State Criminal Police Office did not follow up on it.

The group was removed in September 2017. After the Munich shooting, Atchison wrote an epitaph to Sonboly on Encyclopedia Dramatica, calling him a "true Aryan" and "true German". He also claimed to have been friends with Carter Boyles, a 15-year-old interested in school shootings who killed himself by gunshot at his high school in 2016. After his death, Atchison wrote the Encyclopedia Dramatica entry on his suicide. He commented under a video made by Boyles mourning him, and arguing that while "[s]uicides are ignored, [...] [s]uicidal people who commit mass murder [...] become celebrities."

=== FBI investigation ===
Excerpt from Atchison's interview with the FBI

Atchison had no previous criminal record; however, he was investigated by the FBI in March 2016, due to an online post indicating his interest in purchasing weapons for a mass shooting. The post stated that he was "plotting [a] mass shooting" and asked for "weapons that are good for killing a lot of people within a budget".

This post was traced to the computer of Atchison's older brother after the post was flagged, and investigators visited Atchison at his home on March 24, 2016. He convinced FBI investigators that he was simply "trolling", and that he was "not the type to actually do any of this stuff". He told the agents he had previously been suicidal and that he was fascinated by school shooters and guns. When asked for assurance by the agents, he told them to put him on a watch list. The investigation was subsequently closed when it was determined that, other than an airsoft pellet gun, he did not own a firearm, and that he had not committed a crime. He later described the FBI visit on his YouTube channel, saying he had been investigated after someone reported his profile, but that the FBI did not think that he was a legitimate threat and that they "understood the satire".

Following a miscommunication with the FBI, Aztec police were instead provided information about Atchison's older brother, who they believed had made the online posts. A sketch in addition to the name and photo of his brother were posted inside the police station as part of a "use caution" bulletin. There was no follow up and this was not corrected. Police did not share information about the threat with the school district or the school resource officer.

== Planning ==
In November 2017, Atchison traveled to Sportsman's Warehouse in Farmington, where, with his father, he legally purchased a 9mm Glock semi-automatic pistol that he would later use in the December attack on the school. After the gun was purchased, his father told him "not to point it at anyone" and, in jest, to "never do a school shooting". Two weeks before the attack on the school, Atchison and his brother took the handgun and a .22 caliber rifle out for shooting.

Several weeks before the attack, Atchison visited Aztec High School to do surveillance. He was escorted around the school and given a tour by a teacher. His father later told police that his son played a video game that allowed him to simulate a practice run of the school shooting. The day before the shooting, two police officers spoke casually to him at the gas station where he worked, there to fill up their patrol cars. According to the officers nothing seemed out of the ordinary.

A timeline for the killings was found in Atchison's home, with the last entry being "8[a.m.] Die." A thumb drive discovered on his person contained the same schedule, and a note (or manifesto). Composed at 6:51 a.m. on the day of the attack, it read in part: "If things go according to plan, today would be when I die. [...] I go somewhere and gear up, then hold a class hostage and go apeshit, then blow my brains out" and "Work sucks, school sucks, life sucks. I just want out of this shit." The note also detailed his plan to wait until students got off the buses and went to class. Atchison began to walk to the school at 7:30 a.m.

== Shooting ==
On December 7, 2017, at 8:04 a.m., Atchison entered Aztec High School disguised as a student. He carried a backpack containing the gun and several magazines. Atchison entered a second floor bathroom of the 800/900 building to gear up, but Francisco Fernandez walked in on him. Atchison then shot him, before exiting the bathroom and going into the hallway, where he encountered and killed Casey Marquez. According to the autopsy reports, both victims were each shot numerous times. He then walked up and down the halls, firing randomly, shooting into some classrooms. He reloaded multiple times throughout the shooting.

The school custodian, Thomas "Emery" Hill, chased after him, shouting about an active shooter and yelling at teachers to lock their doors. Katie Potter, a 74-year-old substitute teacher, heard the gunshots and the following loudspeaker announcement calling for a lockdown. As a substitute teacher, Potter did not have keys to the computer lab, so she ushered her 17 students into the computer lab office and barricaded the door with a couch. Atchison came to the room, yelling that he knew they were in there and fired several shots into the room through the wall. No one was hit. Atchison then exited the computer lab and proceeded into the hallway before killing himself via a shot to the head at 8:16. San Juan County Sheriff Ken Christensen credited Potter's swift action with saving many lives. State authorities confirmed that there were no other injuries. Police arrived at the school less than a minute after receiving the first calls about the shooting. As the school was in lockdown, police entered through a door and window, shooting out the window shortly before Atchison killed himself.

Students were in class at the time and heard what they believed was someone punching the lockers, before realizing it was gunfire. Teachers and students hid in locked classrooms until they were told by officials to walk out toward the back of the building and the parking lot; they were later reunited with family members at McGee Park. Other schools in the area were locked down.

=== Victims ===
Casey Jordan Marquez, aged 17, a senior, and Francisco "Paco" Fernandez, a junior, also aged 17, were identified as the victims. Both were student-athletes at Aztec. Marquez was a cheerleader, and Fernandez, a recent transfer to the school, was a football player.

== Aftermath ==
After the shooting, the community gathered around the town in locations such as churches, a park, and community centers, holding a candlelight vigil and giving prayer services. One resident held a sign arguing teachers be allowed to carry guns, while others waved American flags. New Mexico Governor Susana Martinez said the acts of bravery at the school had saved lives and prevented the shooting from being worse than it was. She spoke at the vigil, telling the crowd "all of New Mexico is with you".

The mayor of Aztec, Sally Burbridge, posted on Facebook in the aftermath of the shooting, saying: "Right now we need to keep each other in our hearts and thoughts and take care of each other." U.S. Senator Martin Heinrich stated he was "distraught" after learning of the shooting and called for action addressing gun violence in America. He further describing the shooting as "a parent's biggest nightmare" and said that "[e]very child deserves to be safe at school". Local schools remained closed the next day.

=== Investigation ===
Three agencies assisted with the investigation of the shooting, including the San Juan County Sheriff's Office, the FBI, and the New Mexico State Police. State Police stated the two victims were not specific targets. San Juan County Sheriff Ken Christesen said Atchison was "determined to create as much carnage as he possibly could", and that he had planned on killing many more students. Interviewed shortly after the shooting, Atchison's father had guessed he was the perpetrator but was surprised he had killed himself.

The precise motive is unspecified. Shortly after the shooting, Brice Current, a captain at the Sheriff's Office, speculated on the motive, saying only that: "I really don't think he had a motive other than to be famous in that world, whatever world that is." On December 15, a week after the shooting, The Daily Beast published an investigative article about the online history of the shooter. Several months later, the Southern Poverty Law Center (SPLC) followed up on The Daily Beast investigation, publishing its own report asserting that the white supremacist views of the shooter were to blame for the attack. In the report, the SPLC argued that Atchison was linked to the alt-right, in particular a pattern showing at least 13 other males with alt-right views carrying out similar attacks since 2014.

The San Juan County Sheriff's Office disputed the claim, accusing SPLC of politicizing the shooting as they did not have a link between a possible motive and white supremacism in the case. The sheriff's office came to this conclusion based on the lack of evidence showing that Atchison's views led to him targeting the victims. While there were a variety of theories, the only facts that could be ascertained, the sheriff's office said, are "that the shooter had serious issues and was hell bent on mass casualties for his own personal notoriety." The sheriff's office completed their investigation in August 2018, concluding that Atchison had no accomplices and no known motive for the attack. They believe that he chose the anniversary of the attack on Pearl Harbor, which occurred just before 8:00 a.m., on December 7, 1941, for the attack on the school, as someone believed to be a relative of his had died in that attack. A detective for the office said they believed Atchison had wanted to commit his act on a day that was already notorious for his own benefit. The Aztec Police Department gave a public presentation, overview, and detailed timeline of the shooting incident at Aztec City Hall on October 17, 2018.

The coroner's report and autopsy on Atchison revealed a self-inflicted gunshot wound to the head and bruised knuckles. His body displayed several neo-Nazi symbols and words on his skin. These symbols included a swastika, SS runes, and the acronym "AMOG" (manosphere slang for "Alpha Male of Group") on his upper thigh. The phrase "BUILD WALL" appeared above his left knee, and "your home" on the right of his groin. Atchison's toxicology report revealed that no drugs or alcohol were present in his body on the day of the shooting.

Though the Federal Criminal Police Office (BKA) of Germany knew of the connection between Atchison and Sonboly since December 9, 2017, the Bavarian State Criminal Police Office (LKA Bayern) were not informed until June 2018, even though the latter were in charge of the investigation. After the connection with Sonboly was revealed there was criticism over the German police's inability to prevent the attack, with police sheriff Brice Current saying in response "We did not receive any information on Atchison from Germany. It is a total disappointment if they had information, but did not share it with us."

=== Lawsuits ===
The family of Casey Jordan Marquez filed two wrongful death lawsuits in response to the incident. The first lawsuit was filed against the Aztec school district and police department on December 6, 2019. The suit claimed administrators failed to heed the advice of a 2013 school security assessment which recommended securing the school perimeter with new infrastructure improvements such as fencing and a funneled entrance. According to the lawsuit, the security assessment was dismissed by the superintendent and a board member as a risk that was "simply too remote" to support funding security enhancements.

Marquez's mother filed a second wrongful death lawsuit on June 8, 2020. This time, she sued the FBI, claiming that the agency was negligent in the death of her daughter and that the shooter could have been stopped if the FBI had performed a threat assessment that took into account all of the available information then known about him. For example, according to the suit, the FBI dismissed the threat without examining the student's case file held by the school, which would have shown a history of psychological and family problems and had been a target of bullying. The agency also failed, the suit claims, to investigate the link between the shooter and David Sonboly in 2016, whose attack occurred after the FBI closed their initial investigation of Atchison. The suit was seeking unspecified damages for lost value of life, pain and suffering, in addition to loss of earning capacity. The suit against the FBI was dismissed with prejudice on December 14, 2020, for technical reasons, ruling the FBI had immunity for its decision to not investigate further.

== Legacy ==
The incident led to New Mexico legislators funding additional school safety infrastructure for fencing and entrances. At Aztec High School, more school resource officers were put in place, the perimeter of the school was secured, and external doors were hardened with new remote locking radio alert technology. Additionally, there was a push by the New Mexico Police Chiefs Association to support red flag laws, and making a school shooting a fourth degree felony, in a way similar to a bomb threat. After the shooting, a security door was installed outside of Aztec High.

The shooting was described by some as an instance of incel violence. Atchison had used the name "Elliot Rodger" (the perpetrator of the 2014 Isla Vista killings) online and had praised him as the "supreme gentleman", though it was later described as "unclear" if Atchison identified as an incel. An analysis described the shooting as fitting a pattern of a "mixed motives" type of attack, that was "not obviously perpetrated expressly for political purposes or in furtherance of the incel agenda", but in which the perpetrator had mentioned related beliefs leading up to the attack, noting that the attack had not targeted women and that the motive was unclear. Political scientist Florian Hartleb argued otherwise, saying that his liking of Trump and the far-right markings indicated he could not be viewed as an "apolitical spree killer".

After Marquez was murdered in the shooting, her mother started a non-profit program, AZTECSTRONGSJC, to award college scholarships in her honor to students in New Mexico and Colorado. Her lawyer criticized the FBI's conduct in their investigation of Atchison, arguing that the FBI's inaction was responsible for the deaths in Munich and Aztec and that the FBI had probable cause to examine Atchison's computer, which in his view would have revealed further information. In 2022, Marquez's mother called the shooting "a collective failure", further saying that the community "lost three children that day" and that Atchison had been "raised by the same community mine was. [...] This whole community lost him."

Criminologist Jillian Peterson further criticized the FBI, saying they should have done more, pointing out that although the FBI asked Atchison whether he would attend sessions with a counselor, they did not take steps to facilitate it, and that the FBI agents failed to realize Atchison was someone who was "in a very serious mental health crisis who probably was a danger to himself or others". Katherine Schweit, a former FBI official and mass shooting researcher, concluded that the FBI did a thorough job, and Peter Langman, a counseling psychologist who studies mass shooters and has consulted for the FBI, agreed.

== See also ==
- Gun violence in the United States
- List of rampage killers in the United States
- List of school shootings in the United States
- List of school shootings in the United States by death toll
