= Annette Thoma =

German woman composer

Annette Schenk Thoma (23 January 1886 – 26 November 1974) was a German author, composer, and folklorist who is best remembered for her composition Deutsche Bauernmesse (English: German Farmers’ Mass), a mass in Bavarian adapting folk tunes.

== Life and career ==
Thoma was born in Neu-Ulm. Her father was Lieutenant (later Major General) Albert Schenk. Thoma studied English and French abroad, then married the painter Emil Thoma and moved to Riedering. There she met and worked with the Bavarian folk musician Paul Kiem in 1930 to record local folk music. She wrote a book and many articles about folk music. Thoma composed the Deutsche Bauernmesse in 1933, and wrote the lyrics for the first Salzburg Advent Singing in 1946.

Thoma received the Bavarian Order of Merit in 1964, and the Bayerischer Poetentaler award in 1974. Her composition Die Kleine Messe (The Little Mass) was recorded on:

- TELEF 6 22 149 AG
- EMI 066 32 042
- DAU PLPS 30 159
- AVES INT 160 807

In 2020, Thoma's Deutsche Bauernmesse was performed by a choir in St. Martin, Moosach.

== Books ==
Thoma's works were published by Rosenheimer Verlagshaus. Her publications included:

- Chiemgauer Herbergspiel (Chiemgau Hostel Game)
- Das Riederinger Weihnachtsspiel. (The Riedering Christmas Game)
- Das Volkslied in Albayern und Seine Saenger (Folk Music in Bavaria and Its Singers)
- Die Sternsinger; ein Weihnachtsspiel mit Gesang für Kinder (The Carol Singers; a Christmas Game with Singing for Children)

== Music ==
- "Bei uns" (With Us)
- Deutsche Bauernmesse (German Farmers' Mass), for three voices and instruments
- Die Kleine Messe (The Little Mass)
- Vier Szenen für die Adventszeit zum Spiel von Haus zu Haus (Advent music for a play)
