= St. Martin, Moosach =

Catholic parish in Bavaria

St. Martin
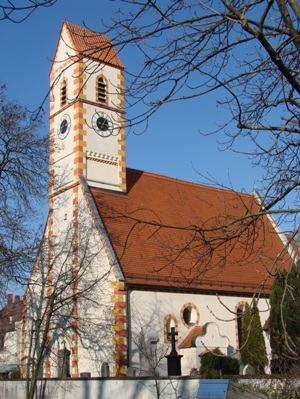
- Alt-St. Martin

- Location within Bavaria Location within Germany
- Coordinates: 48°10′48″N 11°31′07″E
- Country: Germany
- State: Bavaria
- Diocese: Munich
- District: Moosach
- Named after: Martin of Tours
- Website: www.st-martin-moosach.de

St. Martin in Moosach, part of Munich, Bavaria, Germany, is the name of a Roman Catholic parish which has two churches dedicated to Martin of Tours, the old Alte Pfarrkirche St. Martin, one of Munich's oldest churches, and the new Neue Pfarrkirche St. Martin. The new church was dedicated in 1924.

== History ==
=== Alte Pfarrkirche ===
Moosach was an independent community and parish until 1913, when it became part of Munich. A church was mentioned in 815 as a proprietary church of Count Cundhart. The present building dates from the 12th and 13th centuries. It was dedicated to Martin of Tours. The Romanesque origin is only preserved in the walls of the foundation and a Romanesque structure. Around 1500, the church was changed to late-Gothic style. It was damaged during the Thirty Years' War, and at times used as a stable for horses. A sacristy was added around 1700. The interior features were then modernised; the present pulpit dates back to that time. St. Martin was a filial church of Feldmoching, becoming independent again in 1909. The church is surrounded by a cemetery, with the oldest gravestone dated 1619.

==== Furnishings ====
The main altar is in rococo style, created by Josef Anton Fröhlich around 1764/67. It features the patron saint and above him the Trinity. On the side panels, St. Joseph is depicted left with a staff of lilies, and John the Baptist right with a cross staff and a lamb. The left side altar is dedicated to St. Helena who was depicted by Adalbert Kromer in Nazarene style in 1867. The right side altar is dedicated to St. George, with a 1867 altar painting showing Michael the archangel (1867). The altar includes a copy of the Black Madonna from Einsiedeln Abbey. It was made around 1700 and is the oldest surviving copy of the Gnadenbild in Germany. The Annakapelle (St. Anna's chapel), left of the main aisle, features Baroque wood-carved group around St. Anna, possibly by Tobias Bader.

The choir has a ceiling fresco created by Franz Leopold Hager in 1763, depicting the officer of Capernaum requesting that Jesus heals his servant (Matthew 8,5). The fresco in the nave by Martin Heigl in 1758, showing St. Martin, dressed as bishop, praying for the donors of the church. A crucifix and a pietá on the right side of the nave date back to the first half of the 18th century. A pipe organ was built in 1997 by Josef Maier.

=== Neue Pfarrkirche ===
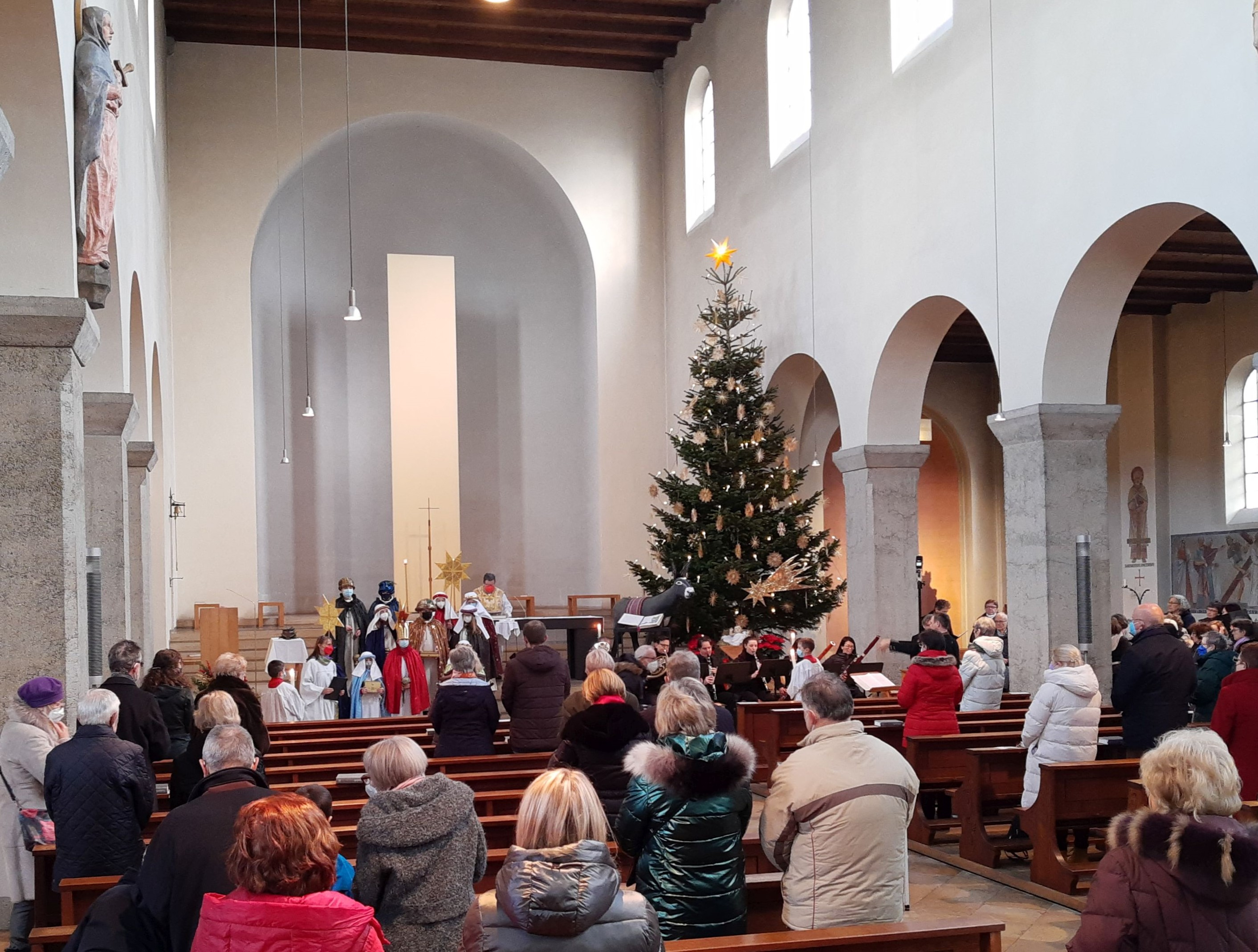
Star singers in Neu-St. Martin in 2022

After Moosach became part of Munich, a larger church was needed because the old one became too small for a growing parish. The new church was built from 1921 to 1924, designed by the Munich architect Hermann Leitenstorfer. He included neo-Romanesque elements in his design in the style of New Objectivity. A relief of St. Martin dividing his coat was created by Karl Knappe.

Joseph Aloisius Ratzinger Ratzinger, the later Pope Benedict XVI, began his career as a chaplain at St. Martin in 1951.

The church had an organ built in 1975 by Guido Nenninger. It was transferred to Poland in 2015, when a new instrument was built by Orgelbau Goll from Lucerne with 40 stops on three manuals and pedal.

A group of star singers from St. Martin, Moosach, was received by then chancellor Angela Merkel in 2012. In 2020, Annette Thoma's Bauernmesse (Peasants' Mass) was performed by choir, woodwind ensemble and strings for Epiphany when the star singers were sent to bless houses.
