= Pelkovenstraße =

Street in Moosach, Munich, Germany

The Pelkovenstraße is a 2 kilometer long inner city street in Munich's Moosach district. It leads from Dachauer Straße to the Riesstraße at the Olympic Press Center. It is named after the house of Pelkoven, who were given the lower court in 1648.

== History ==
The street was the old village street of the former village of Moosach, and had a central importance for the development of the place. Where Pelkovenstraße is today, long before the founding of Munich in 1158, the Salt road and the Roman roads from the Isar near Föhring ran to Augsburg in the west. Moosach developed into a street town with its location on this trade route and consisted of about a dozen courtyards in the 9th century. General Eisenhower held several parades in Moosach in 1945–46. In 1951, Joseph Aloisius Ratzinger, the later Pope Benedict XVI, lived at the parsonage on the Pelkovenstraße.

Within the scope of the construction measures in the area for the 1972 Summer Olympics, the street was broadened, which lead to the bowling alley of the adjoining Gasthaus "Spiegl" having to be demolished.

== Important buildings ==
There are 11 monuments (including the Alte Pfarrkirche St. Martin, the Pelkovenschlössl, the Gasthaus Spiegl and the Moosach Parsonage), as well as, the Moosacher St. Martins Platz, the Mona shopping center and the Olympia-Einkaufszentrum and with the same named subway stop.

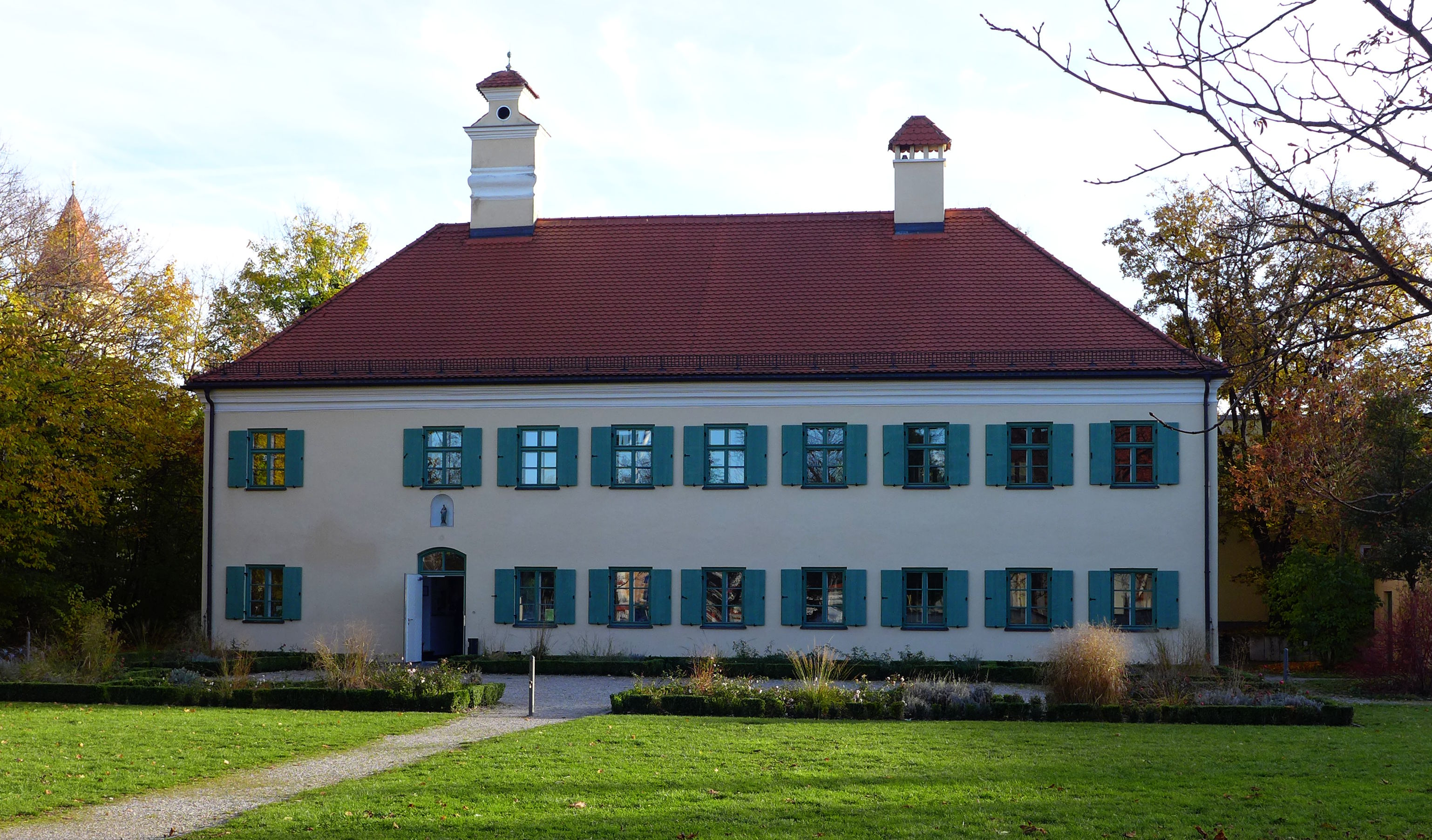
Pelkovenschlössl

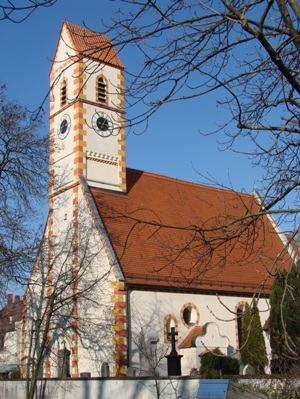
St. Martin

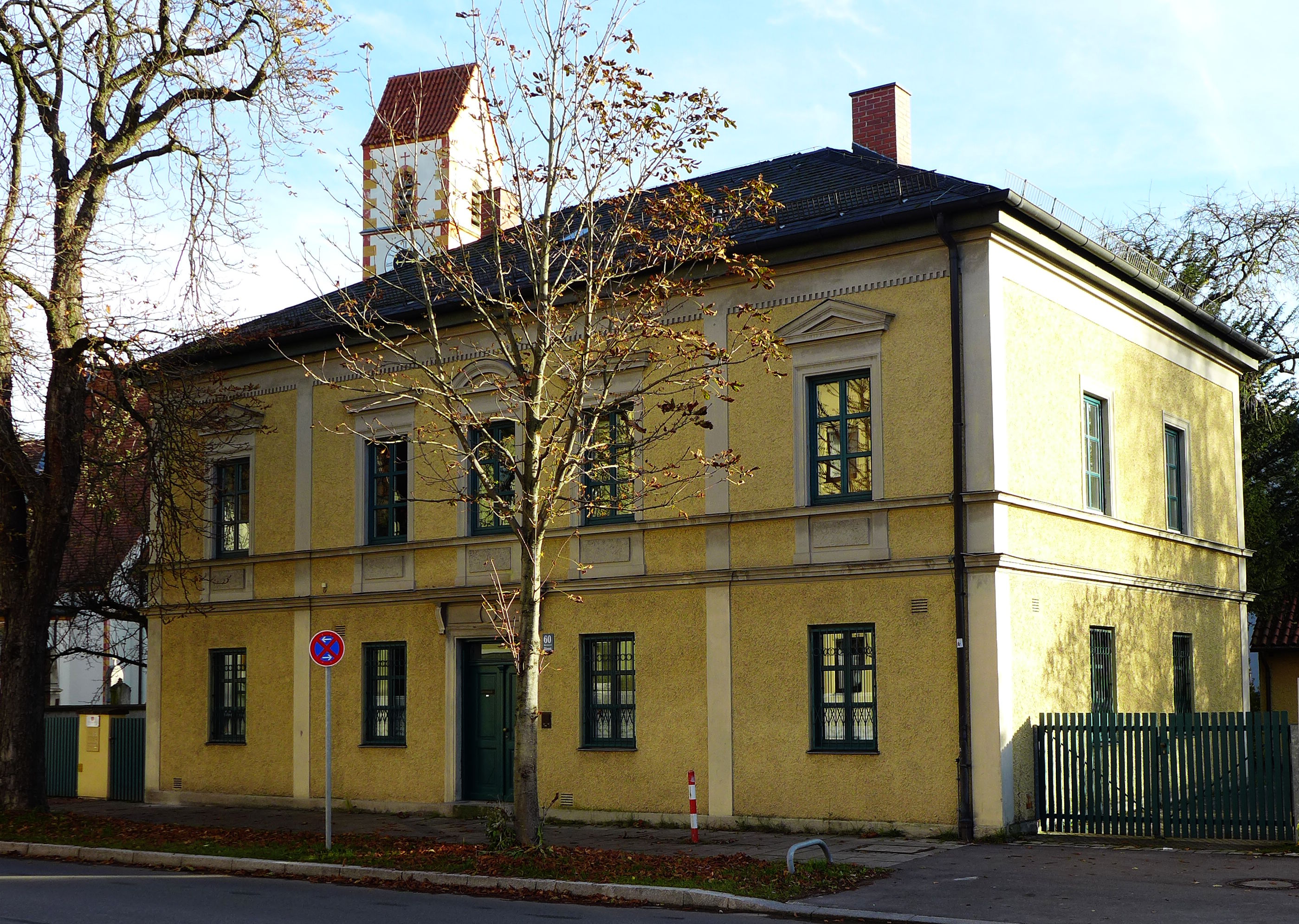
Parsonage

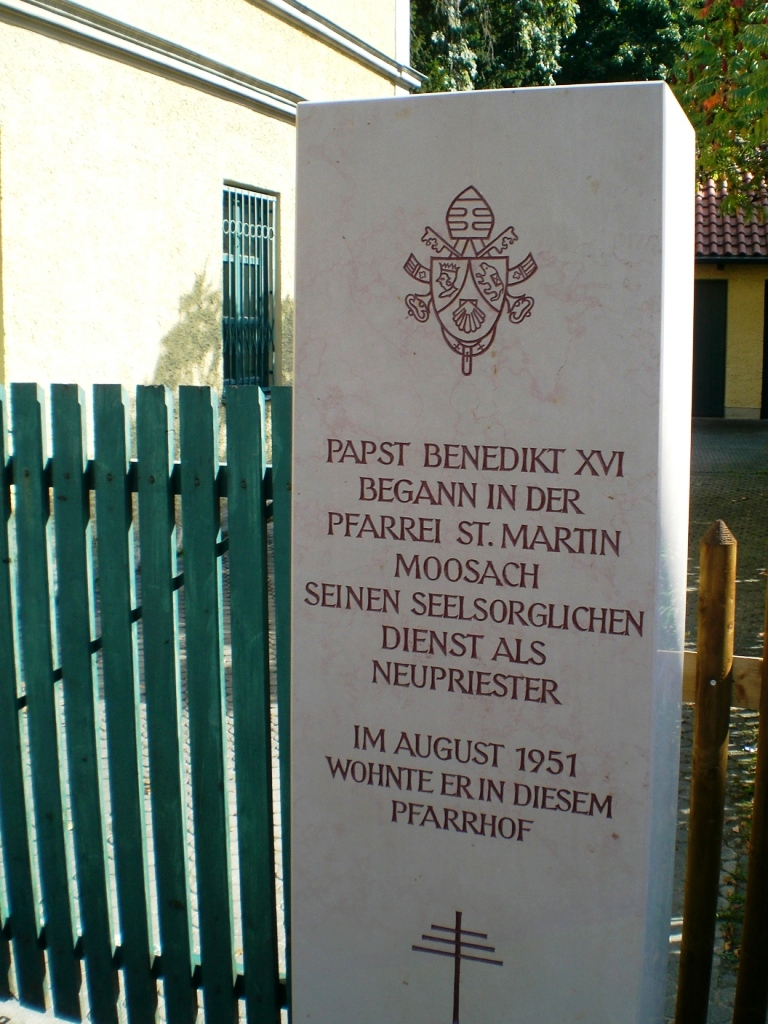
Stele for Benedikt XVI

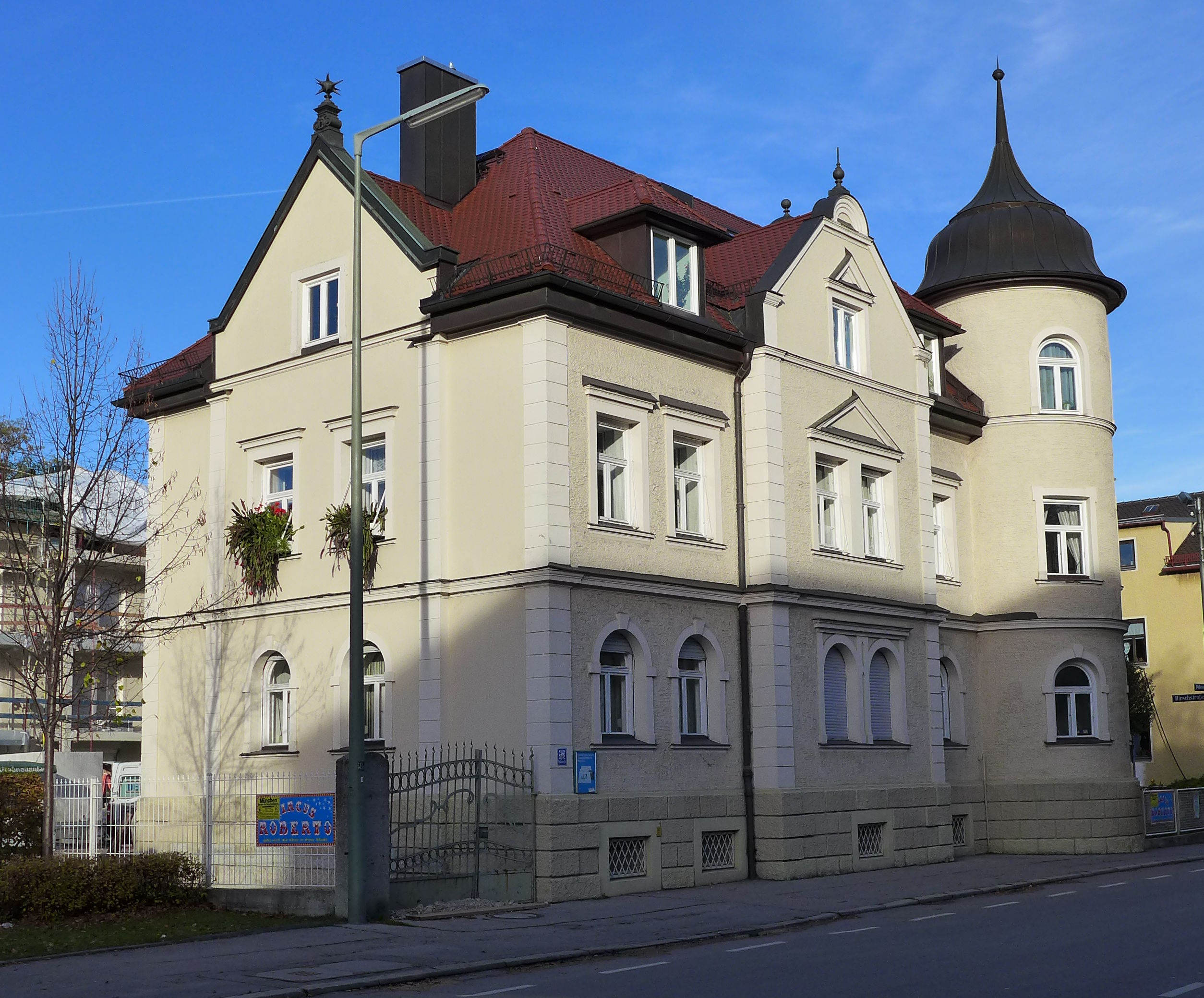
„Gascho“-Villa
Pelkovenstraße 37

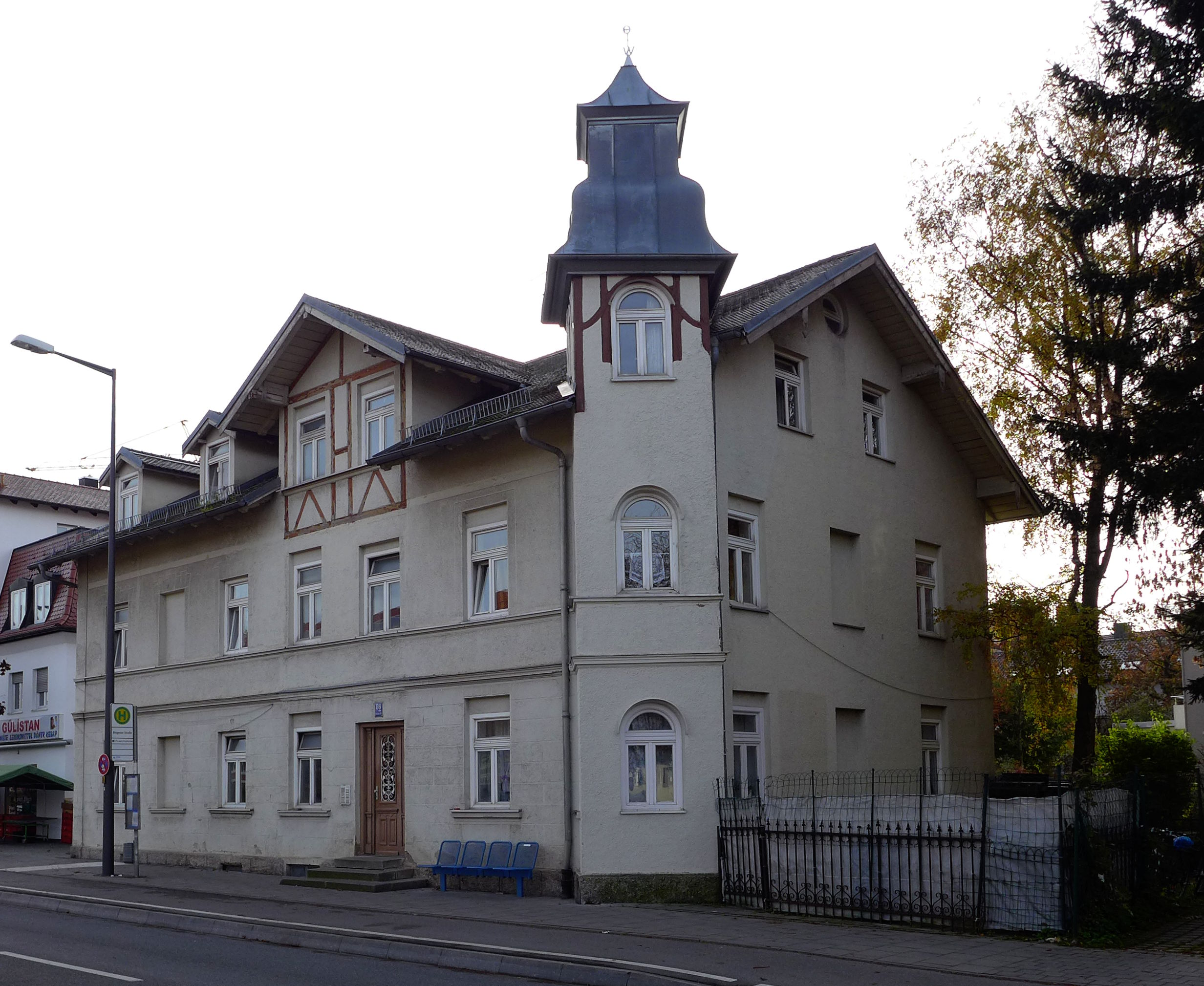
Pelkovenstraße 86

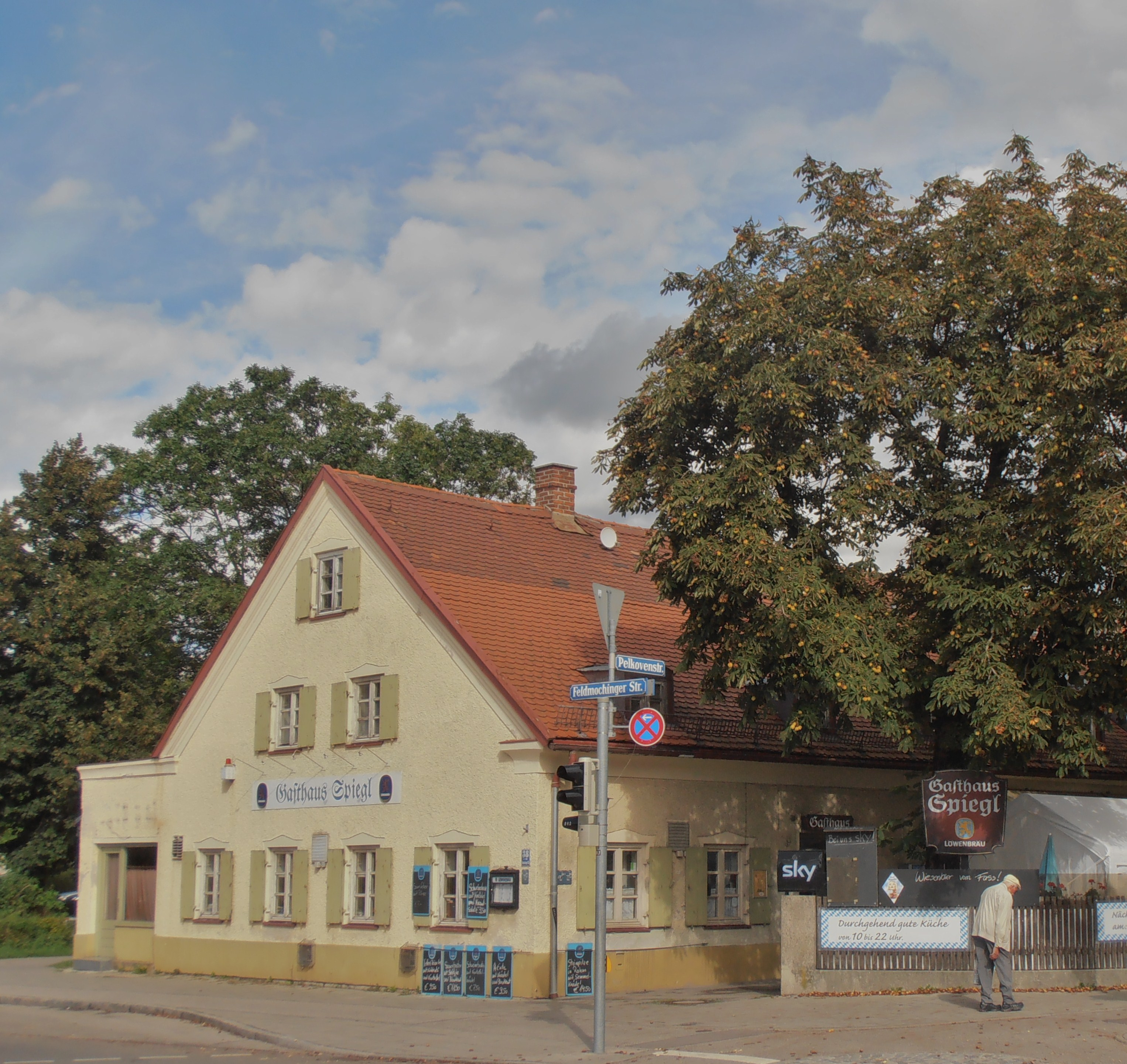
Gasthaus Spiegl

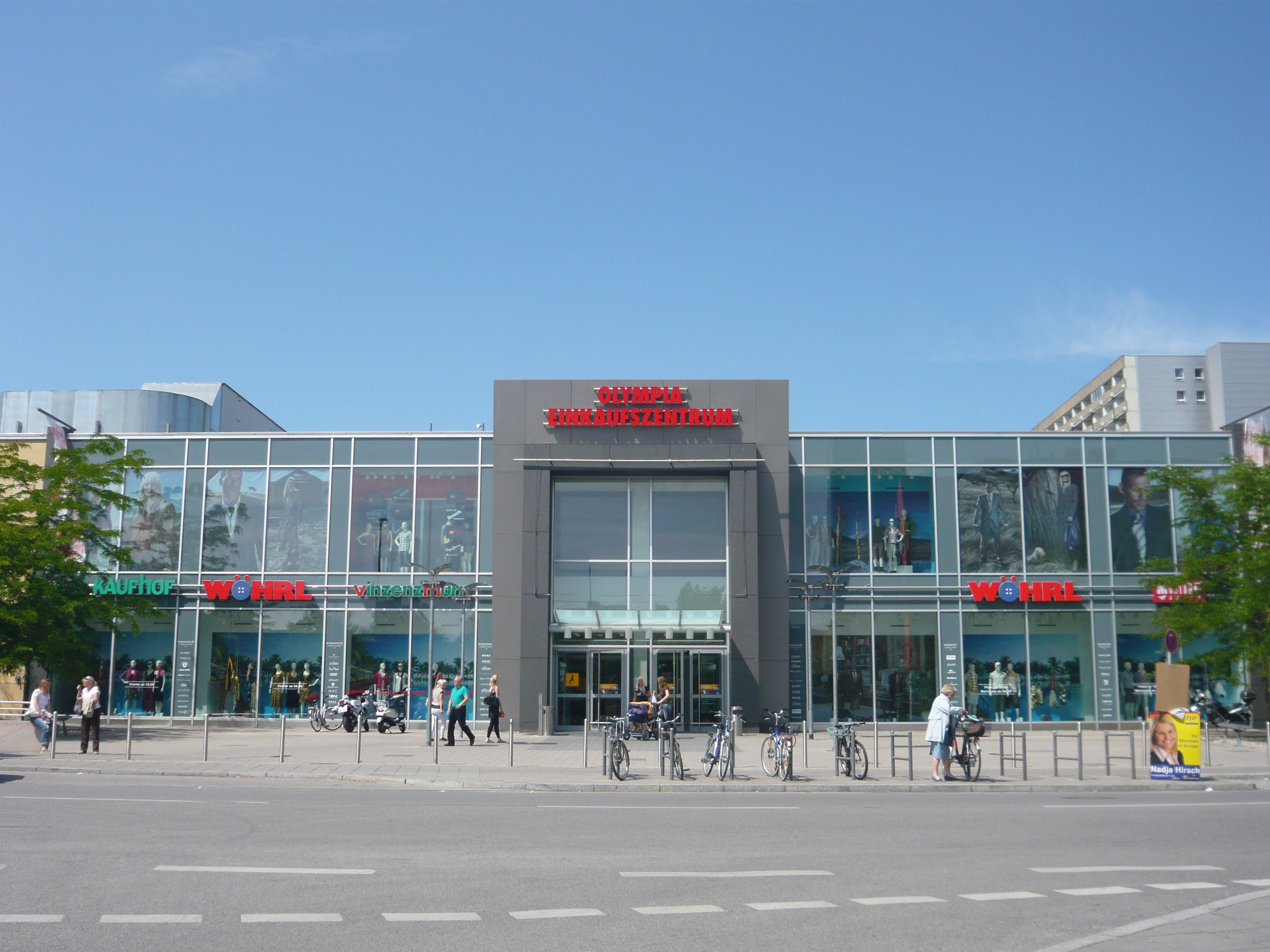
Olympia-Einkaufszentrum

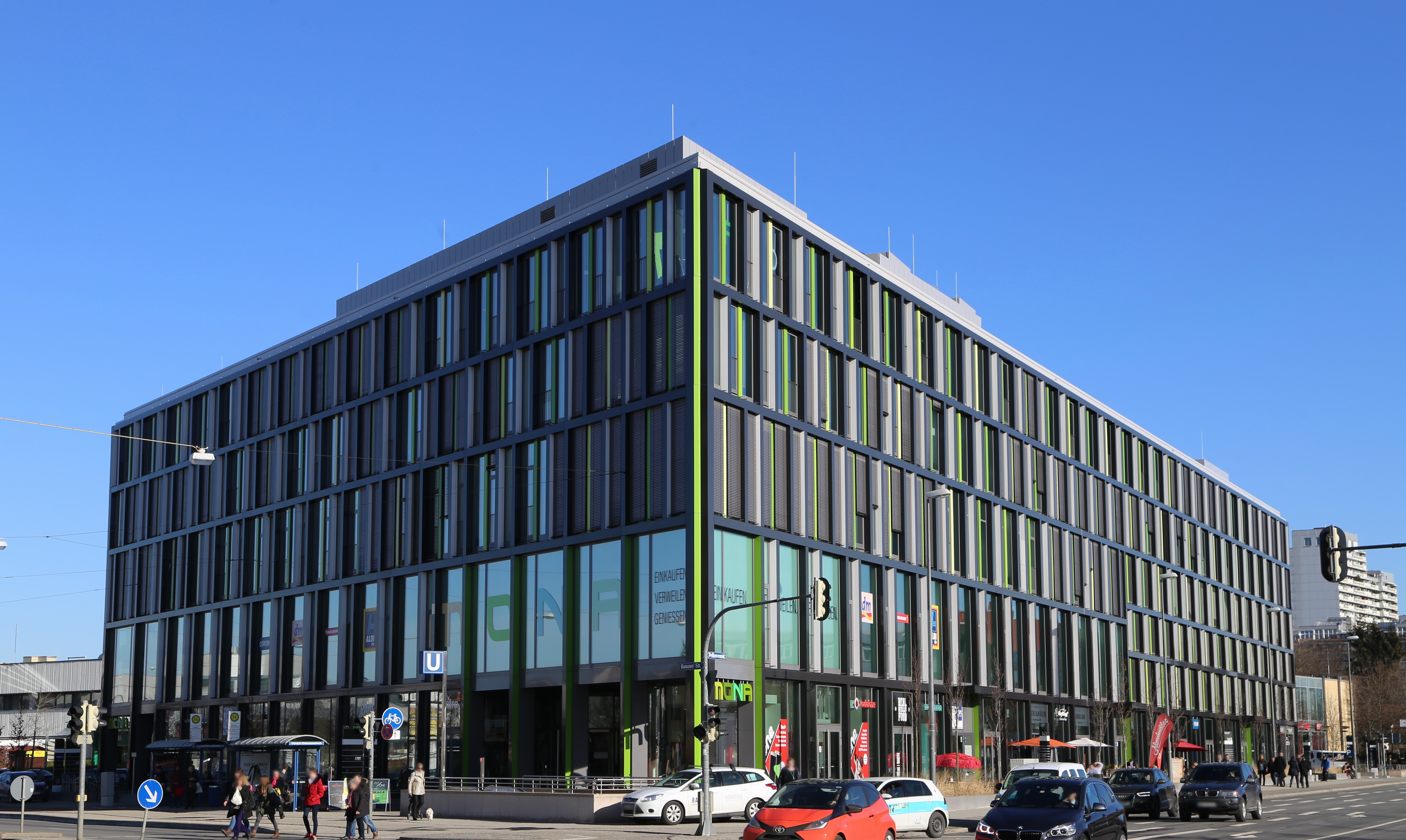
Mona shopping center
