= Peter F. Langman =

American psychologist and author (born 1960)

- Born: February 20, 1960 (age 65)
- Education: Ph.D.
- Alma mater: Clark University; Lesley College; Lehigh University
- Scientific career
- Fields: Counseling psychology
- Thesis: A qualitative investigation of multicultural education (2000)
- Website: schoolshooters.info

Peter Fabbri Langman (born February 20, 1960) is an American counseling psychologist and author. He is a known expert on school shooters.

== Professional career ==
Langman received his B.A. in psychology from Clark University, his M.A. in counseling psychology from Lesley College, and his Ph.D. in counseling psychology from Lehigh University.

In 2009, he published his research on ten school shooters based on the analysis of the Columbine High School massacre, the Virginia Tech shooting, the Red Lake shootings, the Thurston High School shooting, the 1998 Parker Middle School dance shooting, the 1998 Westside Middle School shooting, the 1997 Heath High School shooting, and the 1997 Bethel Regional High School shooting. Langman's book Why Kids Kill: Inside the Minds of School Shooters has been translated into German, Finnish, and Dutch. When the book had been found in the Munich shooter's home as well as in the Arapahoe High School shooter's home, a discourse began regarding whether the shooters had used the book as inspiration or for looking for a role model, someone to emulate.

In 2015, he continued his research by extending the number of analysed school shooters from ten to 48 and published the book School Shooters: Understanding High School, College, and Adult Perpetrators. On the website Psychology Today, Langman hosts a blog, "Keeping Kids Safe," but it has not been updated since 2016.

== Books ==
- Peter Langman: Warning Signs: Identifying School Shooters Before They Strike. Langman Psychological Associates, LLC, Allentown, PA 2021. ISBN 9780578922997
- Peter Langman: Why Kids Kill: Inside the Minds of School Shooters. Palgrave Macmillan, New York 2009. ISBN 9780230608023
- Peter Langman: School Shooters: Understanding High School, College, and Adult Perpetrators. Rowman & Littlefield Lanham 2015 ISBN 9781442233560
- Peter Langman: Jewish Issues in Multiculturalism: A Handbook for Educators and Clinicians. Jason Aronson 1999 ISBN 9780765760296
- Peter Langman: The Last Days of John Keats and Other Poems. 2009 ISBN 9780578005539
- Peter Langman: A qualitative investigation of multicultural education. (Dissertation) 2000
