= Olympia-Einkaufszentrum =

Coordinates: 48°11′0″N 11°32′1″E

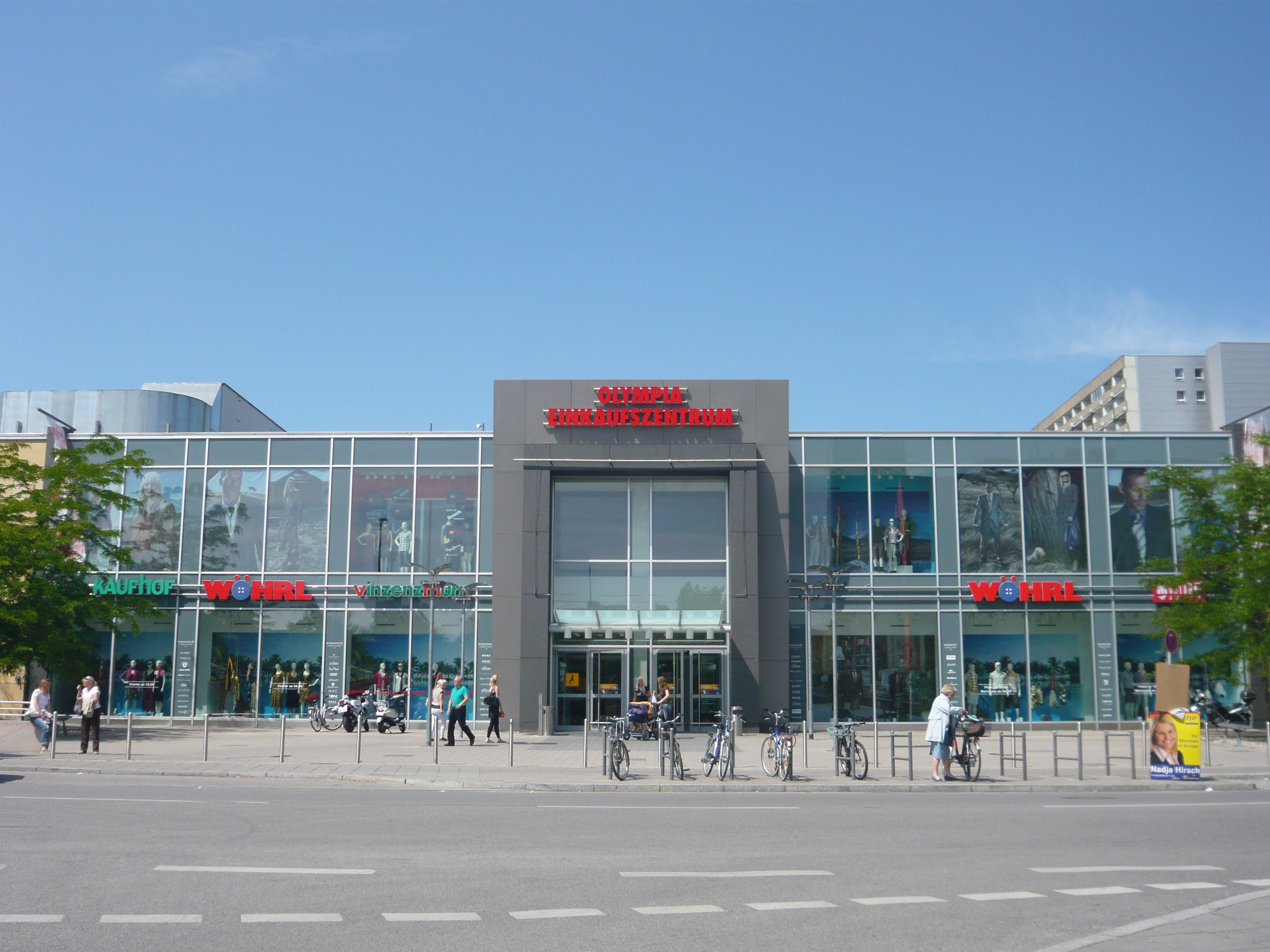
- Location: Moosach, Munich, Germany
- Address: Hanauer Straße 68, 80993 München
- Opened: 25 May 1972
- Owner: ECE Projektmanagement
- Architect: Hans Baumgarten & Curt O. Schaller (1993/94)
- Num. of stores: 135
- Floor area: 56,000 m^{2}
- Floors: 2
- Parking: 2,400
- Public transit: U1, U3
- Website: www.olympia-einkaufszentrum.de

The Olympia-Einkaufszentrum (OEZ) or Olympia shopping mall is a shopping mall opened in 1972. It is located in the Moosach district of Munich, Germany. The name comes from the simultaneous construction of the adjacent home of the press for the Summer Olympics in 1972. In 1993–94, the shopping centre was extended and modernized by the Munich architects Hans Baumgarten and Curt O. Schaller.

== Shops ==
The sales area of the OEZ, which belongs to the ECE Project Management, covers 56,000 m^{2}. There are around 135 shops spread across two floors, with three department stores, several major clothing chains, and many grocery stores, service outlets, restaurants and cafes.

== Transport ==
The shopping centre is served by Olympia-Einkaufszentrum station on the Munich U-Bahn on lines U1 and U3, and has 2,400 parking spaces.

== 2016 shooting ==
On 22 July 2016, a shooting occurred at the mall. Ten people, including the shooter, were killed and 21 were injured.
