= Moosach (river) =

River near Munich in Bavaria, Germany

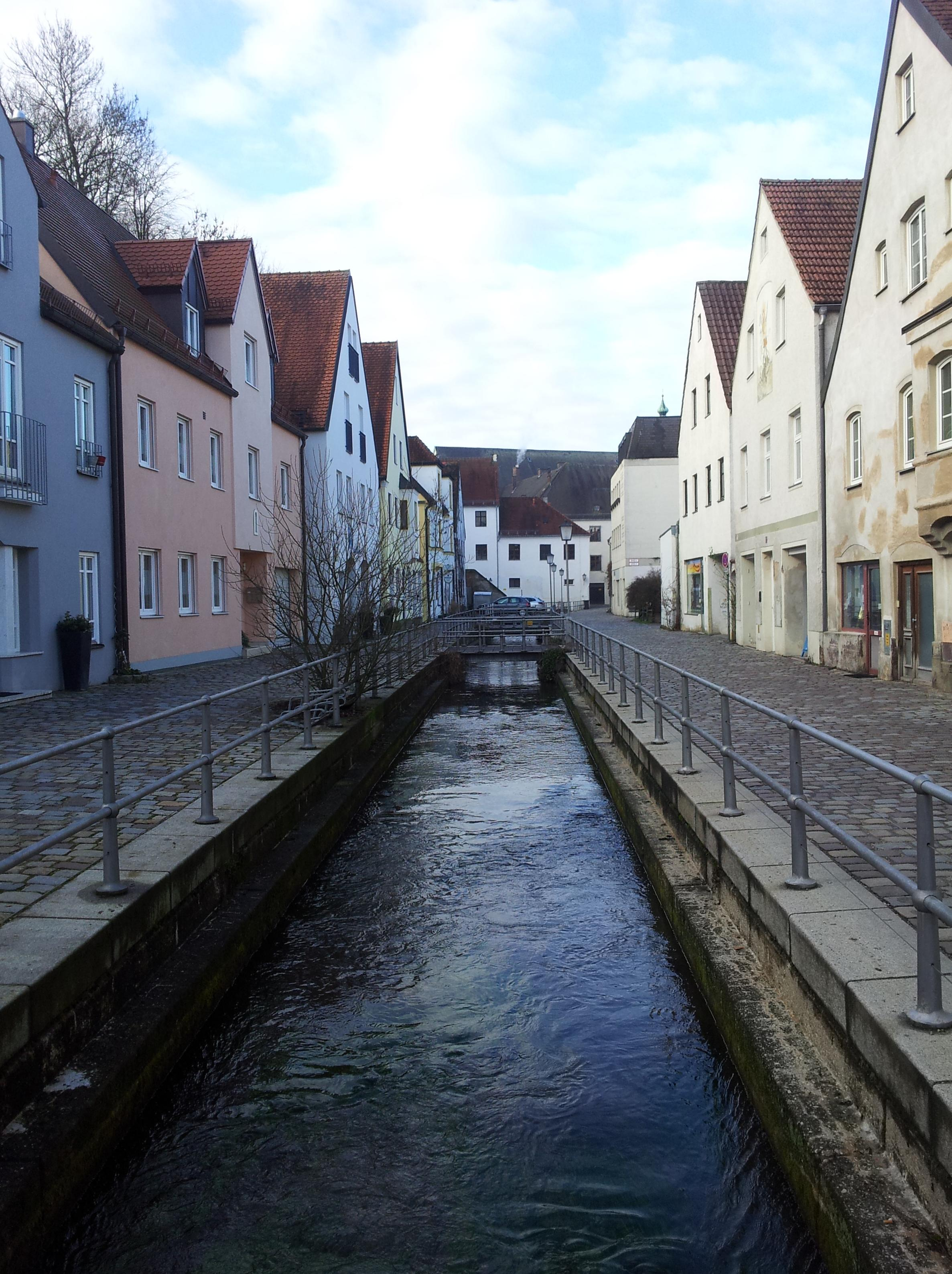
- The Moosach in Freising

Location
- Country: Germany
- State: Bavaria

Physical characteristics
- Mouth
  - location: Isar
  - coordinates: 48.4216°N 11.8817°E
- Length: 38.3 km (23.8 mi)
- Basin size: 189 km^{2} (73 sq mi)

Basin features
- Progression: Isar→ Danube→ Black Sea

Moosach (German pronunciation: [ˈmoːzax]) is a 38-kilometre-long (24 mi) left tributary of the river Isar near Munich in Bavaria, Germany. It could also be described as a tributary of the river Amper, because of the stream Mühlbach splitting away shortly before the Moosach joins the Isar carries about 30% of the water away into the Amper at Moosburg. After passing through Freising, the main flow enters the Isar near Oberhummel (part of Langenbach). The Mühlbach branch continues through Moosburg and enters the Amper close to its confluence with the Isar.

== See also ==
- List of rivers of Bavaria
