= Moosach (Munich) =

Borough of Munich, Germany

Coordinates: 48°11′N 11°31′E

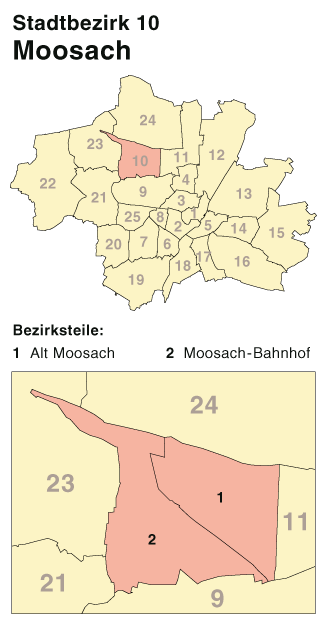

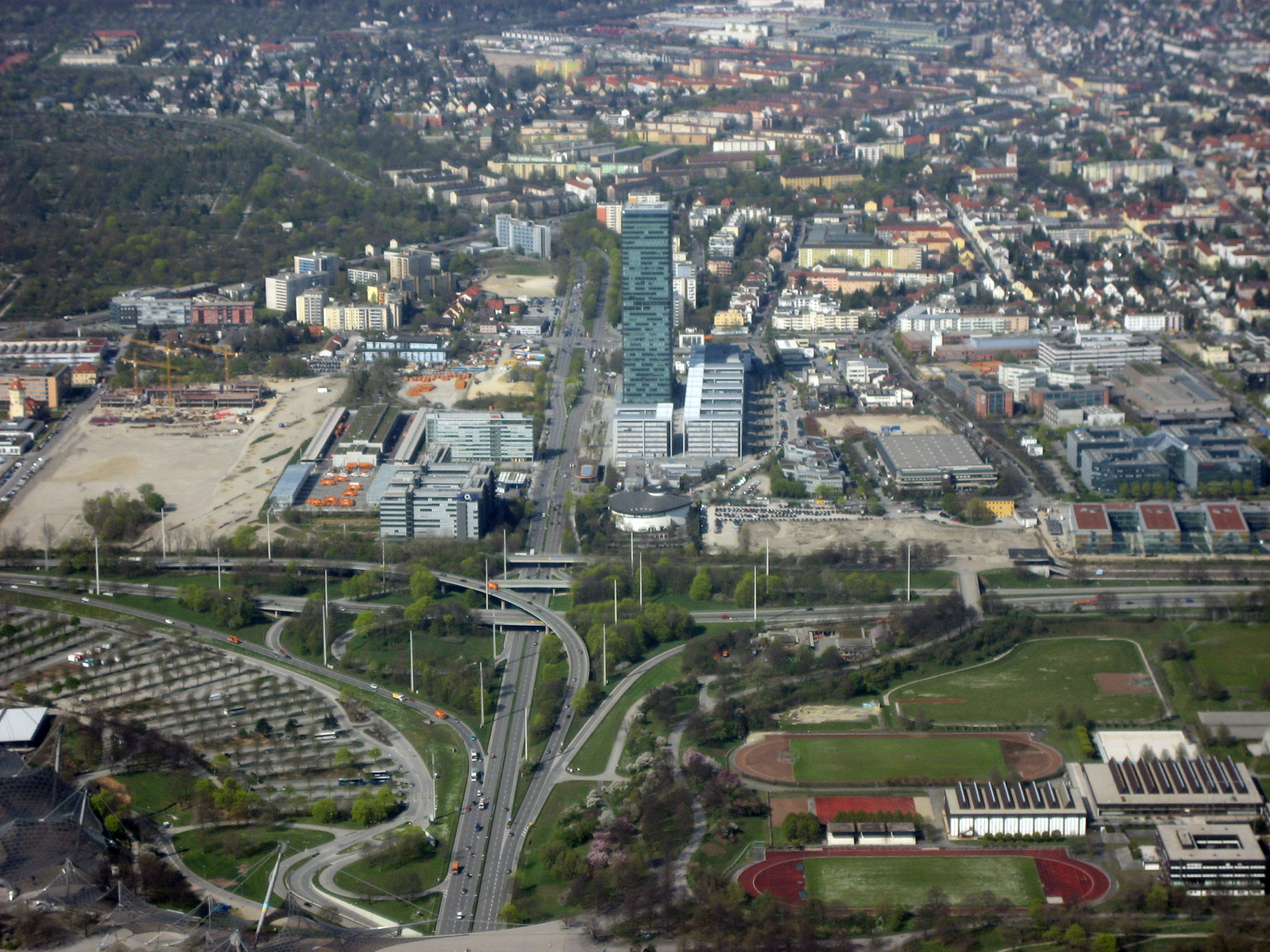

Moosach (German pronunciation: [ˈmoːzax]) is the 10th northwestern district of Munich, Bavaria, Germany. It is sectioned in the urban districts Hartmannshofen, Pressestadt and Borstei.

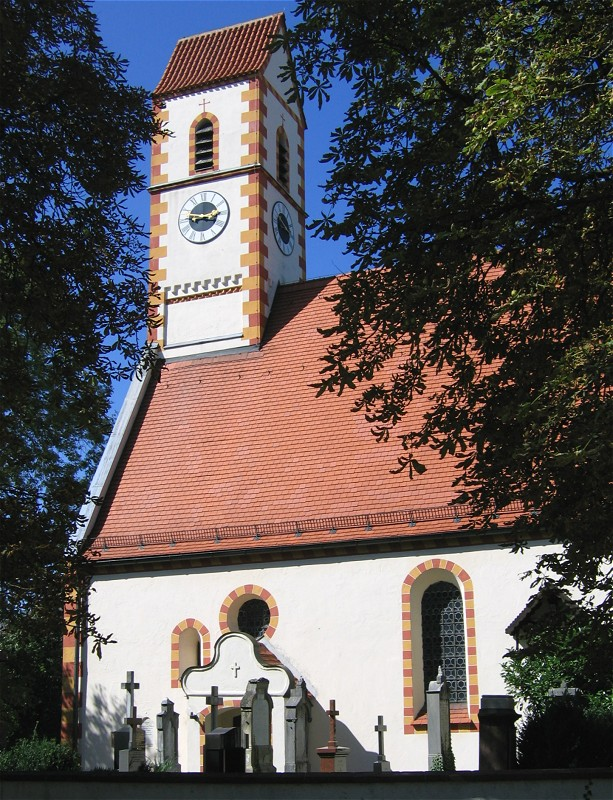
Alt-St. Martin (13. century)

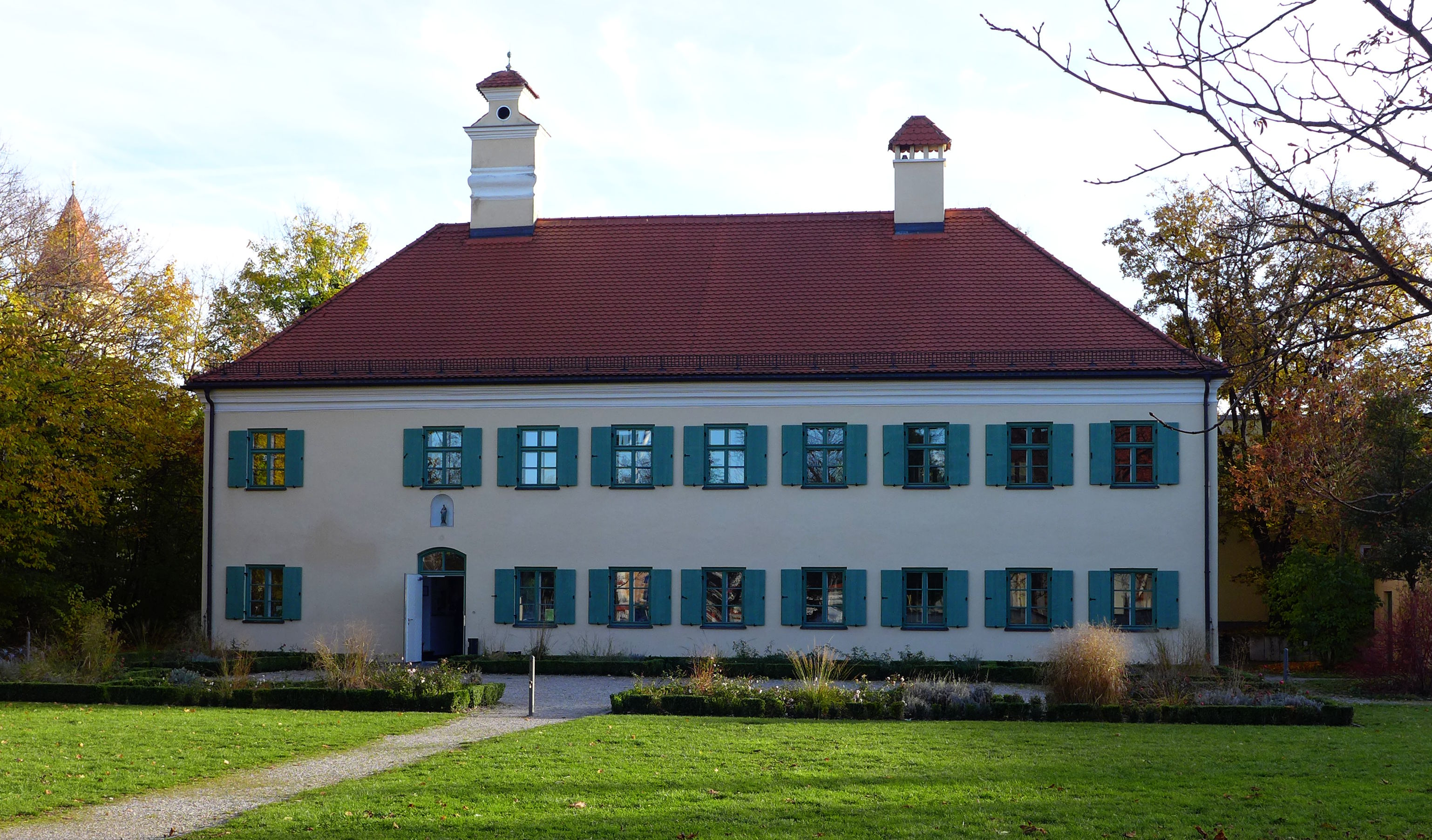
Pelkovenschlössl palace at the square Moosacher St-Martins-Platz

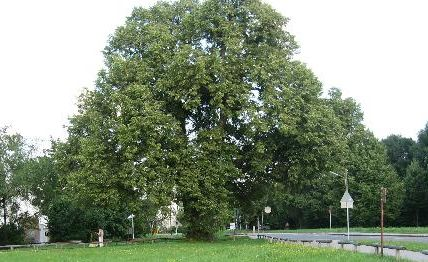
Röth lime tree, oldest tree of Munich

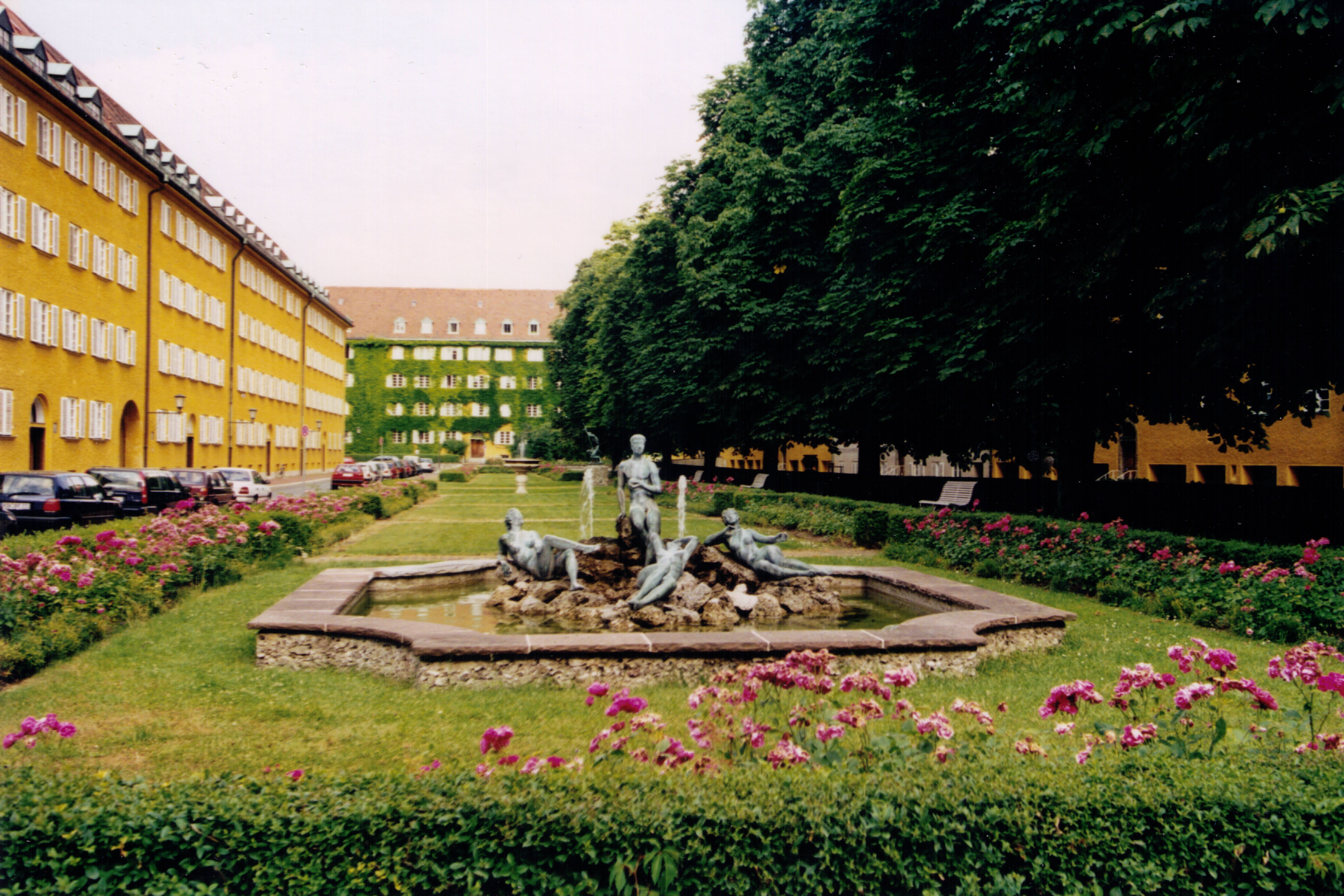
Borstei

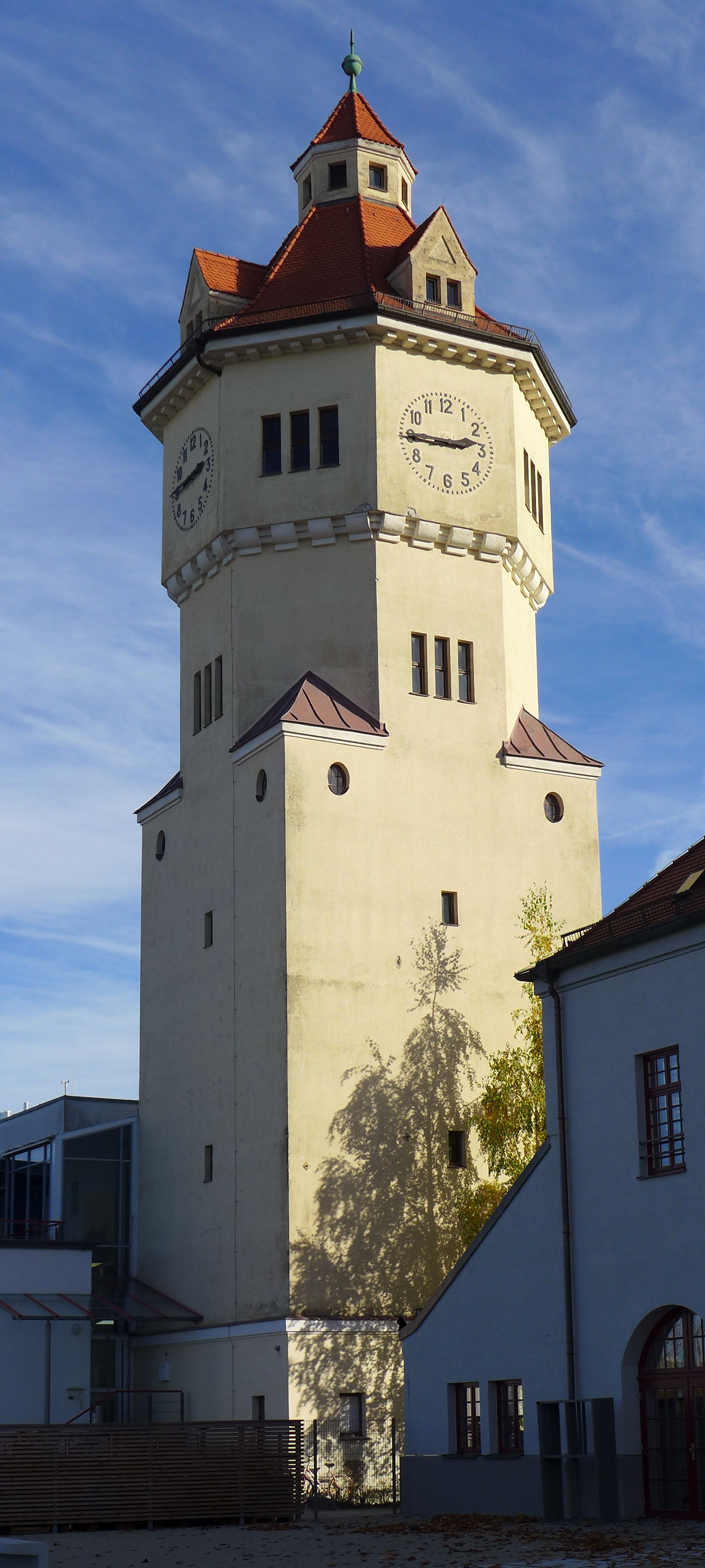
Water tower

It is surrounded by: Feldmoching-Hasenbergl (north), Milbertshofen-Am Hart (east), Neuhausen-Nymphenburg (south), Pasing-Obermenzing (southwest) and Allach-Untermenzing (west).

It has a history of 4000 years of human settlement.

== History and structure ==
An almost uninterrupted chain of prehistoric finds suggests a continuous settlement from 4000 years up to the younger Stone Age. Moosach is thus one of the oldest places around and in Munich. The first documentary mention dates from 4 June 807, and the first church St. Martin was built before 1315. Around 1700 the Röth lime tree, Munich's oldest tree, was planted.

In 1717 Elector Max Emanuel built the Fasanerie, originally a forester's lodge for raising pheasants, today a beer garden with 1500 seats in the self-service area and another 200 seats in the serviced area. In the 1960s, the Free State of Bavaria transformed the area into a park.

In 1818 Nederling joined the municipality of Moosach in the course of community formation.

In 1906, construction of the Moosach gasworks on Dachauer Strasse began. Until 30 June 1913, Moosach was an independent municipality and became part of the 28th district of Neuhausen-Moosach, to which the Gern district of the former municipality of Nymphenburg also belonged. With effect from 1 May 1996, all districts of Neuhausen and Nymphenburg were assigned to the urban district of the same name, 9 Neuhausen-Nymphenburg. Thus, the urban district 10 today essentially covers the area of the former municipality of Moosach again, which according to the last list of towns before the incorporation in 1904 covered an area of 1184.44 hectares.

The Pelkovenstraße played an important role for Moosach as a salt and trade route. General Eisenhower held several military parades there in 1945/46. He stayed the night at the Netzervilla.

During World War II, the German Nazis established and operated a forced labour camp in the district. This camp and the treatment of inmates is described in great detail by Lion Feuchtwanger in his book The Oppermanns that was first published in 1934, making it one of the earliest of the concentration camps.

Urban development in Moosach essentially only began after the Second World War. Single-family houses, terraced houses and smaller apartment buildings (privately financed, publicly supported and cooperatively) make Moosach a district with a lower residential density than in the inner-city areas. As a result of intensive development of the building areas still available, the population density is also increasing significantly in the areas of Moosachs. To the east, the buildings with the Olympic press town and housing estates from the inter-war period are concentrated. The model settlement Borstei, built between 1924 and 1930 in the southeast corner of the district, is remarkable.

In Pelkovenstraße is the oldest church in Moosach and next to it the former rectory. The church belongs to the parish of St. Martin. The former rectory is now rented. Next to it, a stele was erected in honour of Pope Benedict XVI, who had taken up his first post as new priest in St. Martin in 1951 as Joseph Aloisius Ratzinger and lived in the parsonage.

The Lutheran parish of Munich Heilig-Geist looks after many faithful in Moosach who gather in three churches: Church of the Holy Spirit, Olympic Church and Magdalene Church.

On Pelkovenstraße, the main axis of the old Moosach, the oldest inns in the district mark the expansion of the town into the 19th century. The Alte Wirt, one of Munich's oldest inns, stands at the corner of Dachauer Straße and the Gasthaus Spiegl at the other end of the old Moosach at the corner of Feldmochinger Straße.

In 1972 the Olympic Press City for the Olympic Games was built west of Landshuter Allee. The high-rise building at Riesstraße 82 is currently the twelfth tallest building in Munich, 83 meters high. From 2001 to 2004, the Uptown Munich high-rise complex was erected, the second tallest building in the city after the Olympic Tower with a height of 146 meters.

With the influx of middle class members to Moosach, where traditionally small tradesmen, workers and ordinary employees lived, the social structure is more balanced today. According to the occupational position, employees and civil servants dominate among the employed. The household structure is still clearly marked by families with children; single-person households are correspondingly underrepresented.

Jobs are mainly in the manufacturing industry (automotive and mechanical engineering, textiles and clothing and chemicals), in trade (concentrated at "Moosacher Stachus" on Dachauerstrasse, Baubergerstrasse, Bunzlauerstrasse and Pelkovenstrasse as well as in the Olympia Shopping Centre and the local supply centre Mona on Hanauer Strasse) and in the service sector.

== Infrastructure ==
=== Road ===
With the Mittlerer Ring and Moosacher Straße and their feeder roads, Triebstraße, Dachauer Straße and Von-Kahr-Straße, the district is crossed or touched by several main roads with considerable traffic. The landscape protection areas Kapuzinerhölzl and Hartmannshofer Wald, some allotment gardens and the western cemetery in the district provide a certain ecological balance.

=== Rail ===
Moosach is located on the Munich-Regensburg railway line and is served at Munich-Moosach railway station by the S1 line of the Munich S-Bahn. Since 22 November 1930, the Munich district has been connected to the city centre by today's tram lines 20 and N20. The underground lines U1 and U3 at the Olympia-Einkaufszentrum connect Moosach with the Munich underground network. In December 2010, the continuation of the U3 via another underground station at Moosacher St-Martins-Platz to Moosacher Bahnhof was completed. To make the area around the "Moosacher Stachus" more attractive, the surface was redesigned after completion of the underground construction and the associated extension of the tram line, which provisionally ended at Pelkovenstraße from 2004 to December 2008.

In Moosach there are 38 stops of two subway lines (U-Bahn), one suburban railway (S-Bahn) line, two trams (one of which is a night tram) and nine bus lines.

=== Culture and Education ===
In September 2006, the Christian children's and youth work opened the children's and youth center Die Arche. At present, 40 to 60 children between the ages of five and twelve are cared for daily in a temporary building in Brieger Strasse. Other facilities for young people are the parish of St. Martin and the Mooskito youth centre and the boomerang children's and youth centre at Pelkovenstraße 128.

In Ohlauer Straße 16 is the Magdalenenkirche, in Templestraße 5 is the church St. Mauritius, in Lechelstraße 54 the church St. Raphael, in Treibstraße 3 the Christian Free Church Moosach and in Riesstraße 102 the Ethiopian Orthodox Church.

In 2007 the vocational school centre Riesstraße was opened.

The Kultur- und Bürgerhaus Pelkovenschlössl is the central venue for educational and cultural events.

Moosach has an amount of four primary schools and four secondary schools, including the Gymnasium München-Moosach.

=== Sports ===
- PSV München, Franz-Mader-Straße 11
- TSV Moosach-Hartmannshofen, Lechelstr. 35 (founded 1903 as sports club Germania Moosach)
- FC Olympia Moosach, Saarlouiser Straße 86

=== Enterprises ===
- Abfallwirtschaftsbetrieb München
- Meiller
- Studiosus Reisen

== Notable landmarks ==
- Abfallwirtschaftsbetrieb München
- Bahnhof München-Moosach
- Borstei
- Bundestagswahlkreis München-Nord
- Dachauer Straße
- Ehemaliges Pfarrhaus
- Georg-Brauchle-Ring
- Gymnasium München-Moosach
- Hochhaus Uptown München
- Knorr-Bremse
- Landshuter Allee
- Moosach (river)
- München Nord Rangierbahnhof
- Nederling
- Olympia-Einkaufszentrum
- Ortskern Moosach
- Pelkovenstraße
- Schleißheimer Straße (Munich)
- Alte Pfarrkirche St. Martin
- Neue Pfarrkirche St. Martin
- St. Raphael
- Städtisches Stadion an der Dantestraße
- Stimmkreis München-Moosach
- Studiosus Reisen
- U-Bahn station Georg-Brauchle-Ring
- U-Bahn station Moosacher St.-Martins-Platz
- U-Bahn station Olympia-Einkaufszentrum
- U-Bahn station Westfriedhof
- Westfriedhof
