= List of theatres in Munich =

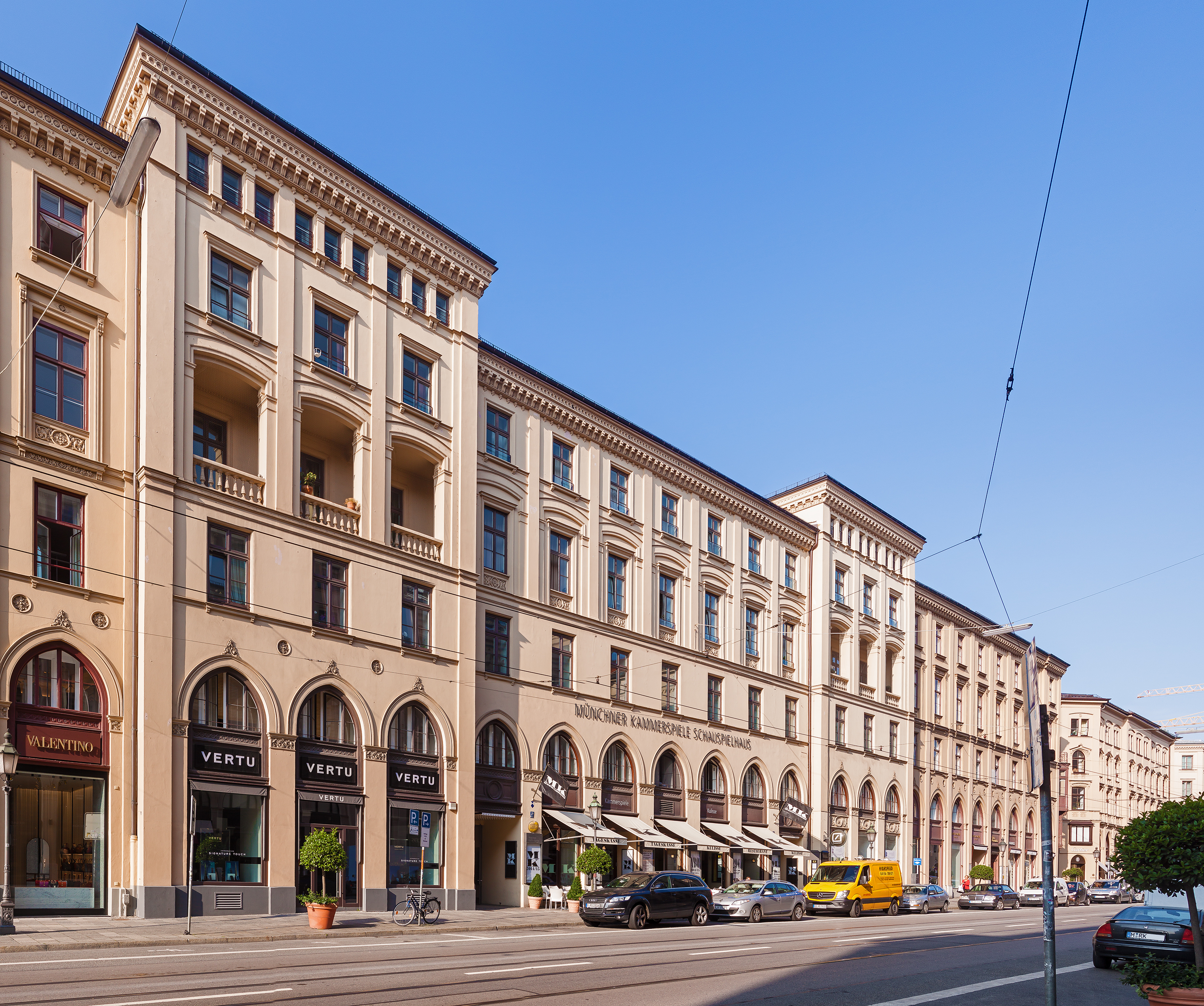
Münchner Kammerspiele

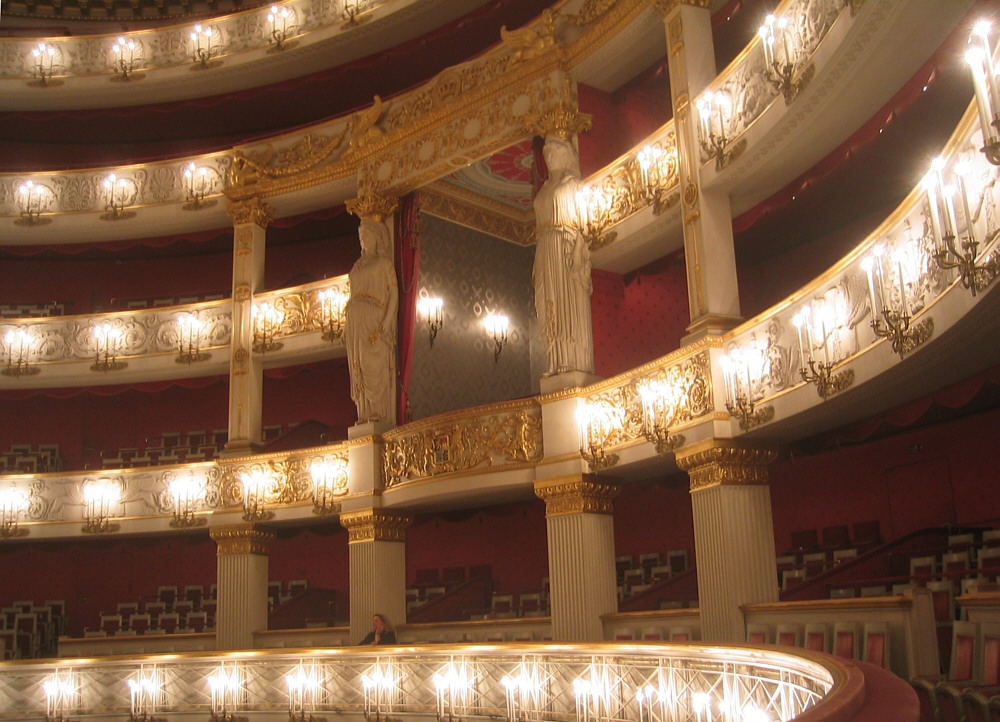
Münchner Nationaltheater

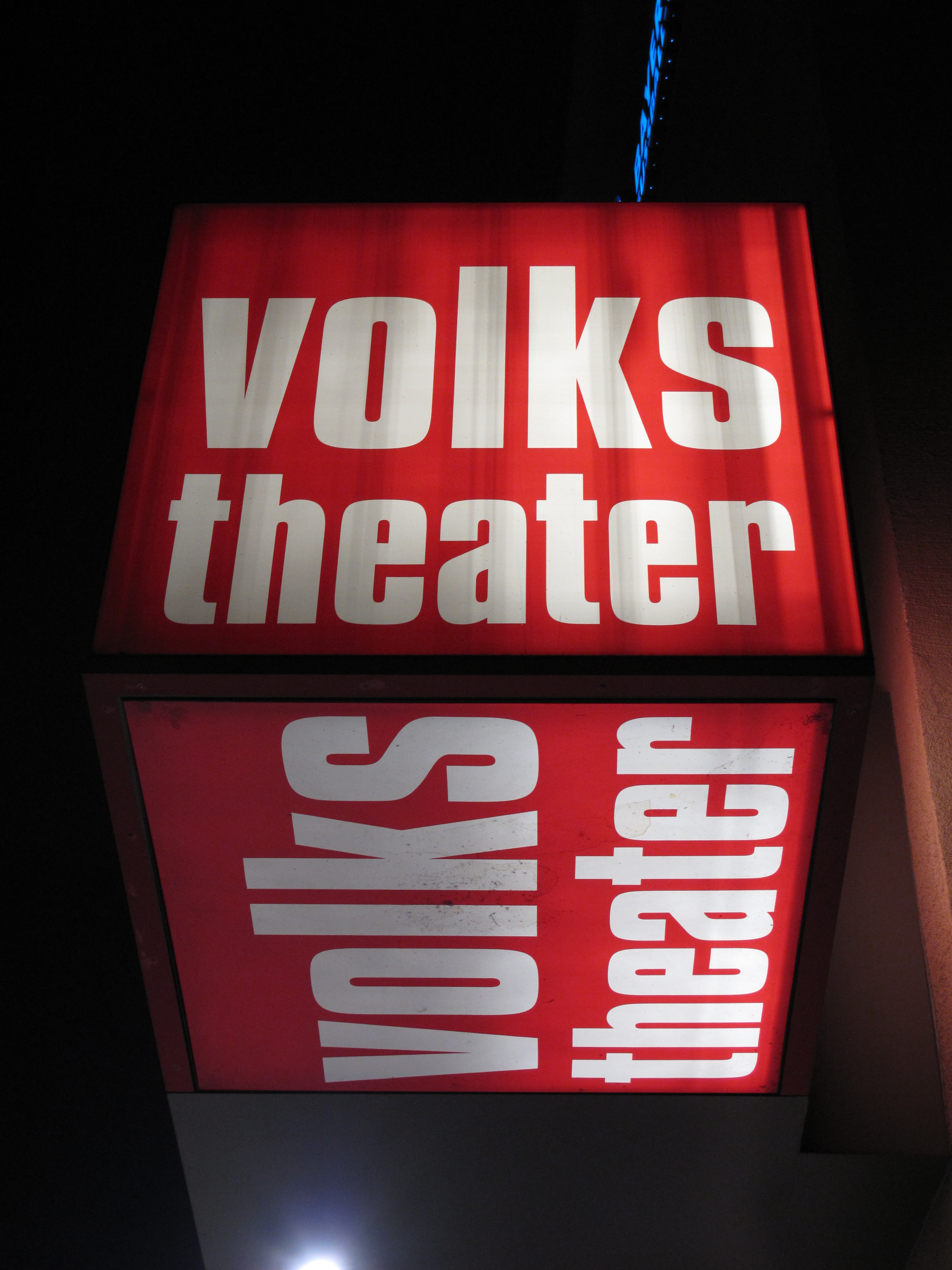

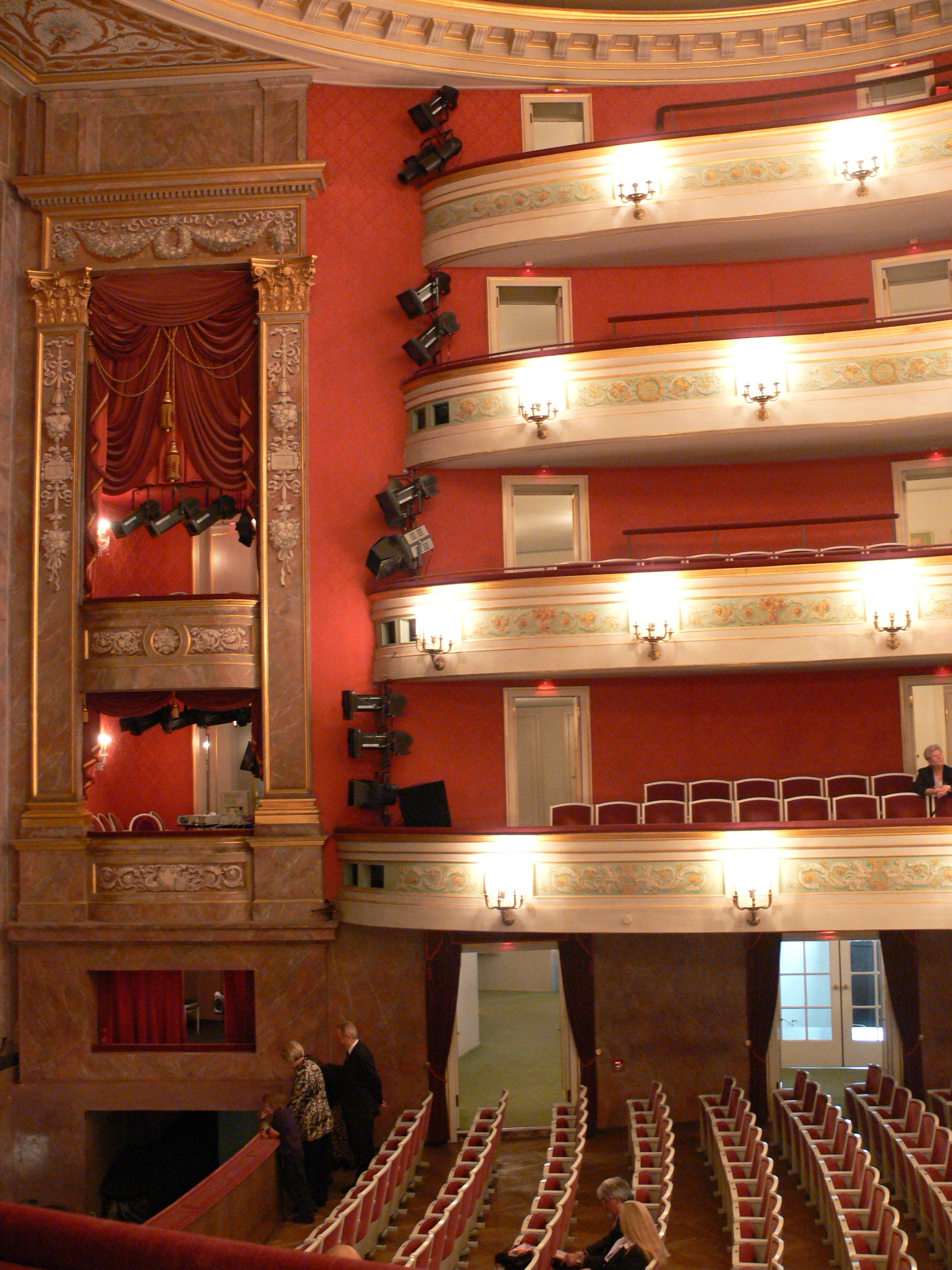
Staatstheater am Gärtnerplatz

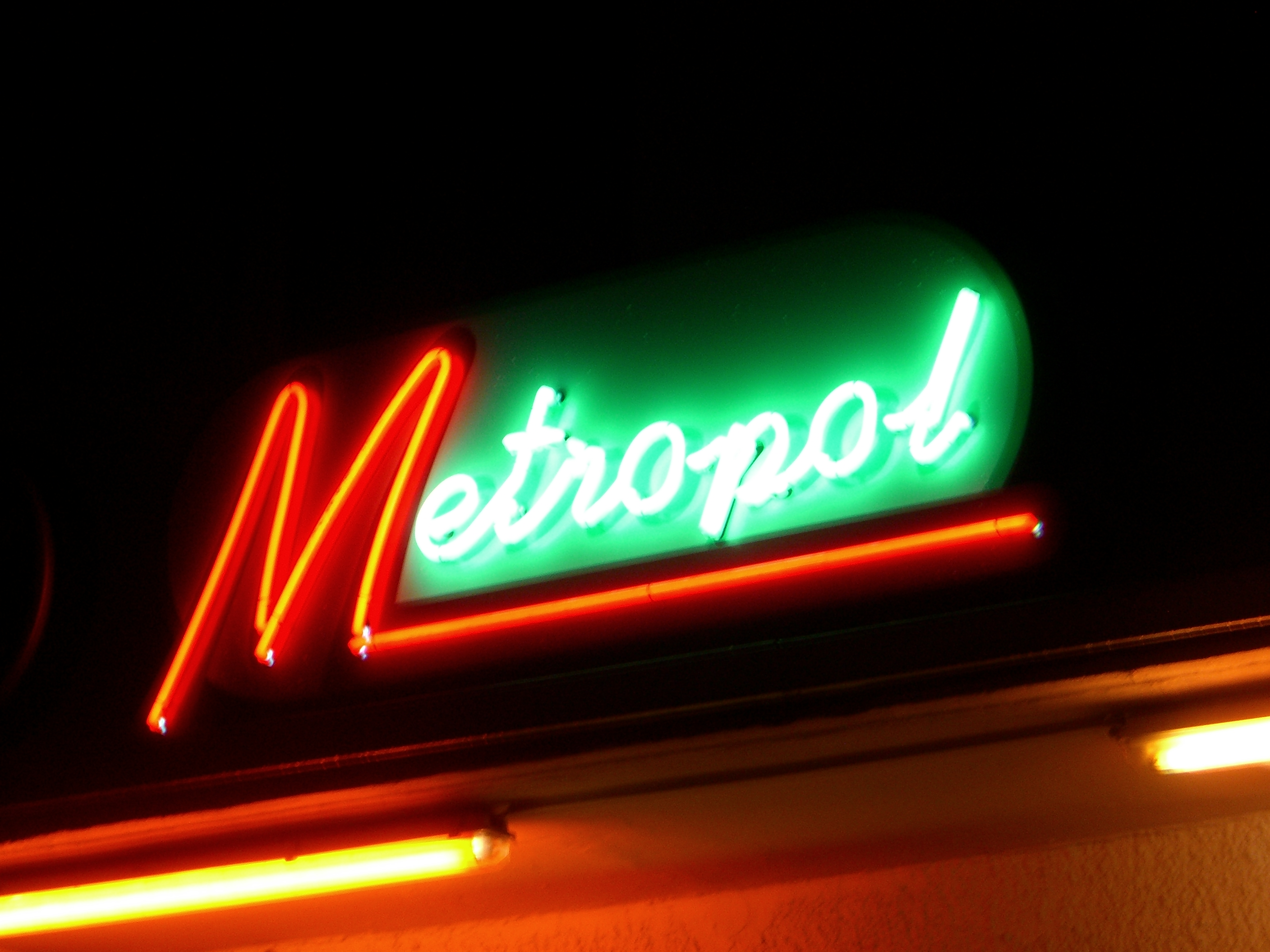
Metropol-Theater

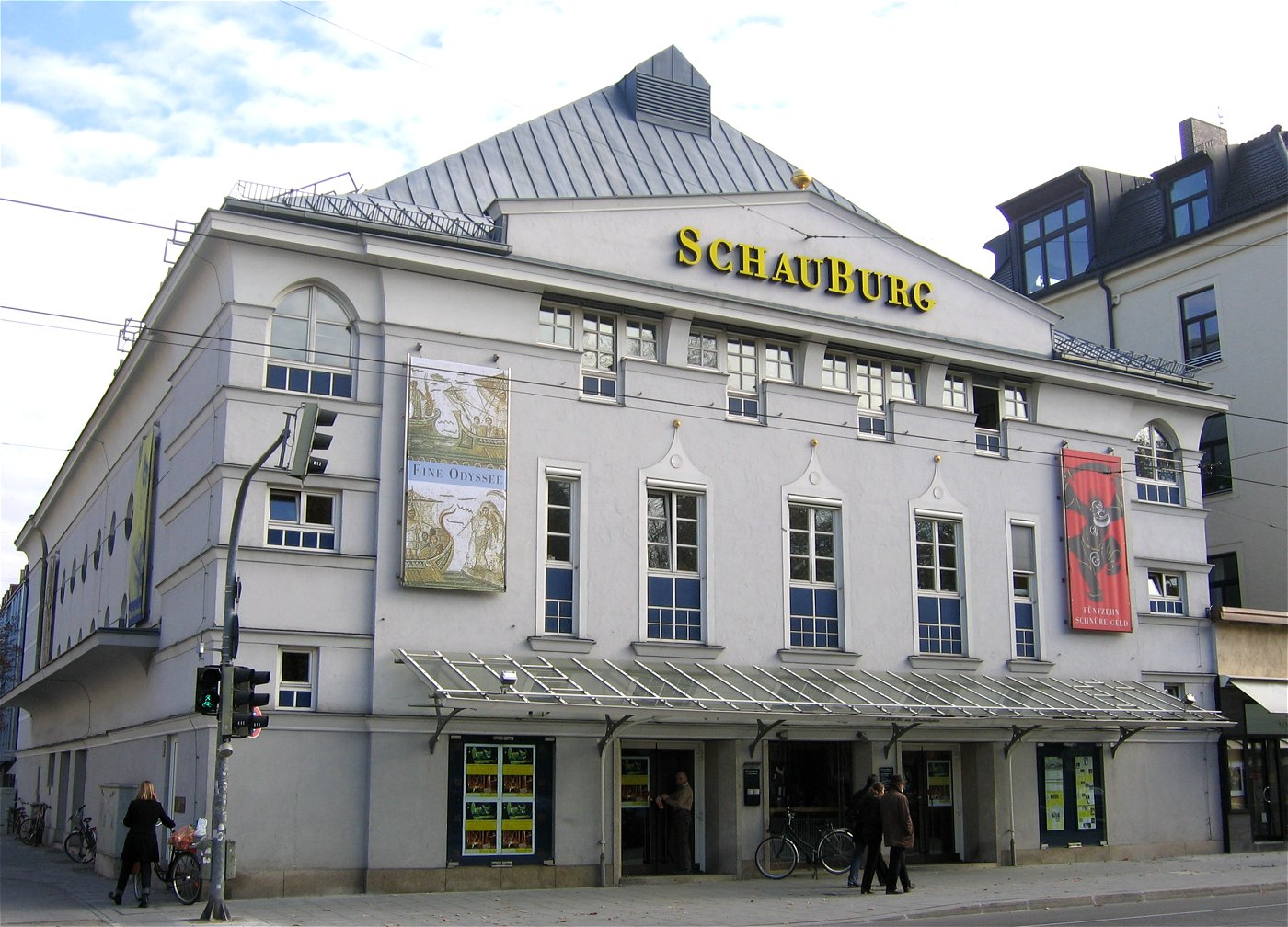
SchauBurg

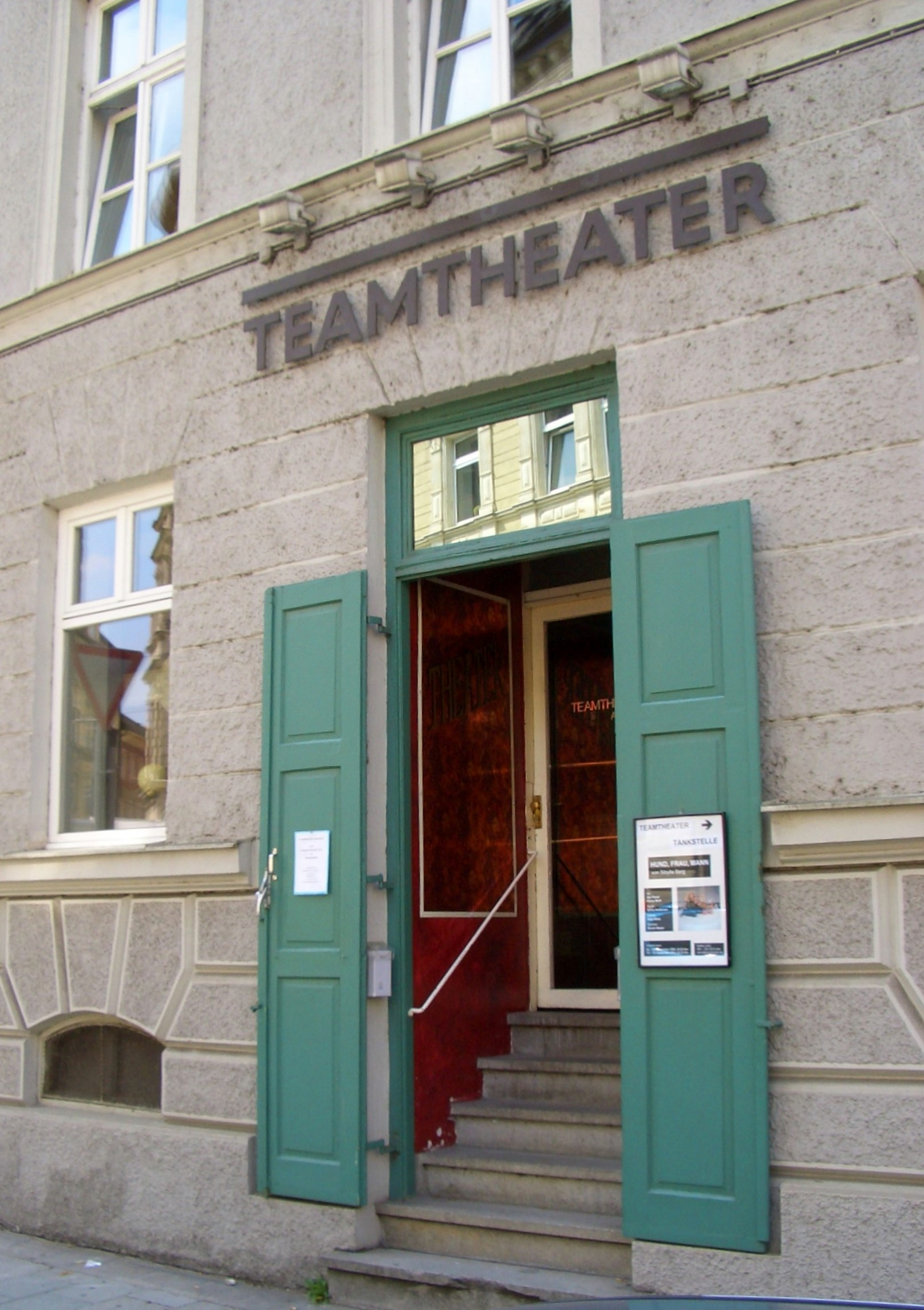
Eingang Teamtheater

In Munich, there are 59 professional theaters (as of 1999) and a variety of amateur theaters.

Major theaters include:

== State theatres ==
- Bayerische Staatsoper (main venue: Nationaltheater München)
- Bayerisches Staatsballett (venue: Nationaltheater München)
- Bayerisches Staatsschauspiel (main venue: Residence Theatre)
- Cuvilliés-Theater
- Pavillon 21 MINI Opera Space
- Prinzregententheater (played by the Bayerische Theaterakademie August Everding, the state theater and concerts)
- Staatstheater am Gärtnerplatz

== City theatres ==
- Münchner Kammerspiele
- Münchner Volkstheater
- Schauburg (München) – Theater der Jugend
- Deutsches Theater, the largest theater for guest performances in Germany

== Private theatres ==
- Akademietheater
- Blutenburg-Theater, Germany's first and unique crime scene
- Das kleine Welttheater
- FestSpielHaus of youth culture in Munich-Neuperlach
- Gerhard Loew Bühne in Oberanger Theater
- GOP Varieté-Theater (formerly Kleine Komödie am Max-II-Denkmal)
- Heppel & Ettlich
- Hinterhoftheater
- Iberl-Bühne in München-Solln
- I-camp/Neues Theater München in München-Au
- INTERIM-Theater
- Kammertheater München, earlier Kammertheater Schwabing
- Komödie im Bayerischen Hof
- LEO 17 - Theater in der Leopoldstraße
- Puppetry Kleines Spiel
- Metropol-Theater
- Münchner Galerie Theater
- Münchner Marionettentheater
- Münchner Theater für Kinder
- Münchner Vorstadtbrettl
- Pathos Transport Theater
- Rationaltheater
- Rohrer & Brammer; closed since May 2010
- Teamtheater, formerly Theater am Einlaß
- Theater44; closed since May 2009
- Theater aus der Reisetasche
- Theater Blaue Maus
- Theater Die Kleine Freiheit (closed)
- theater Viel Lärm um Nichts in the Pasinger Fabrik
- theater ... und so fort, Munich
- TamS

== Amateur theatres ==
- ArtikultTheater
- Dramatischer Club "Alpenröserl" e.V.
- Theatergruppe "Die ganz Andern"
- Theater in der Au e.V.
- Theatergruppe Musikforum Blutenburg e.V.
- Ludwigsbühne München
- s'Bredl
- el teatro e.V.
- Erlebnis Oper e.V.
- Feldmochinger Volkstheater e.V.
- TSV Forstenried e.V.
- Theater gruppo di grappa
- Münchner Heimatbühne e.V.
- Theaterteam Helena
- Kachina Theater GbR
- Theater im Kloster
- Kleine Bühne München e.V.
- Komödien-Brettl Untermenzing
- Laimer Brett'l e.V.
- "Lampenfieber" Bayerisches Volkstheater
- Menzinger Komödienstadl
- Milbertshofener Bühne e.V.
- Laienspielgruppe "s’Moosacher Brett’l" e.V.
- Heimatbühne Obergiesing e.V.
- Bauerntheater in Obermenzing
- Theatergruppe der Pfarrei St. Quirin
- Theatergruppe "Rasselglocke"
- Sendlinger Bauernbühne
- Theatergruppe Siemens e.V.
- Spielgemeinschaft Kleine Bühne e.V.
- "Die Spielmacher"
- Südtiroler Volksbühne e.V.
- "Szenenwechsel"
- Theaterbrett´l 1993 (ehem. Theaterbrett'l St. Klara)
- Theatritis
- Thow & Show
- Theaterverein „Die lustigen Truderinger“
- Theater-Truhe
- Bayerisches Volkskunsttheater
- Münchner Heimtbühne e.V.
- Münchner Volkssänger-Bühne e.V.
- Münchner Vorstadtbrettl
- Volksbühne Waldheim e.V.
- Laienspielgruppe Waldtrudering
- Bayerische Volksbühne Watzmann e.V.
- Weiß-Blaue Bühne e.V.

== See also ==
- List of theatres in Bavaria
