= Hohenzollernstraße =

German street

Coordinates: 48.1605°N 11.5738°E

Hohenzollernstraße is a 2-kilometre-long (1.2 mi) street in Munich's Schwabing district.

== Location ==
It starts at Leopoldstraße, then crosses the Kurfürstenplatz and Hohenzollernplatz and changes after the Winzererstraße in the west to the Schwerere-Reiter-Straße as its extension. Between Kurfürstenplatz and Leopoldstraße are smaller shops. Together with Leopoldstraße the shopping street forms the so-called Schwabinger T.

According to a study by the traffic data and SaaS provider INRIX of 2016, Hohenzollernstraße is the most heavily occupied road in Germany.

== History ==
Until the incorporation of Schwabing to Munich in 1890, the Burgfrieden around Munich ran at the height of Hohenzollernstraße. In 1892 the street was renamed "Hörmannstraße" after the Hohenzollern nobility. In 1901, Wassily Kandinsky founded his art school "Phalanx" on Hohenzollernstraße 6a, where Gabriele Münter became a pupil. In the house number 104, Willibald Besta had his studio there until 1929. Hohenzollernstraße 21 was the location of the 1902 founded "Lehr- und Versuchsatelier für angewandte und freikunst", of Wilhelm von Debschitz and Hermann Obrist, which developed into Germany's largest private educational institution. Paul Klee taught there in 1908. In 1910 Emil Preetorius was the director of the school. In house number 1 lived the writer and painter Fanny zu Reventlow, who was known as "Schwabinger Skandalgräfin". Joachim Ringelnatz lived in the Gartenhaus of Hohenzollernstraße 31a /I from 1920 to 1930. In Hohenzollernstraße 110, Werner Heisenberg spent some fourteen years of his youth.

In 1910, Georg Kerschensteiner founded an experimental school in Hohenzollernstraße 14 which was built in 1905/1906. In 1938, the building was transformed into a hospital, which from 1945 to 1960 served as the "Chirurgisches Krankenhaus München-Nord". In 1961, a high school took its place, where for example, Michael Lerchenberg went to school. Since 1941, between Zentnerstraße and Schleissheimer Straße, on Hohenzollernstraße is the neo-classical styled Nordbad, which includes a grandstand for 1,400 spectators. From 1959 to 2009, Theater44 was located at Hohenzollernstraße 44.

From the Kurfürstenplatz to the west, the tram lines 12 and 27 run over Hohenzollernstraße. Until August 1900, a horse-drawn carriage had already been running along the line from Promenadeplatz to Hohenzollernstraße. Later, tram lines ran from Nikolaiplatz along the entire length of Hohenzollernstraße to Barerstraße, Schwerere-Reiter-Straße and Schleissheimer Straße. In the 1970s, the section between Nikolaiplatz and Kurfürstenplatz was no longer used.

== Historic buildings / Heritage buildings ==
33 historic architectural monuments lie with Hohenzollernstraße.

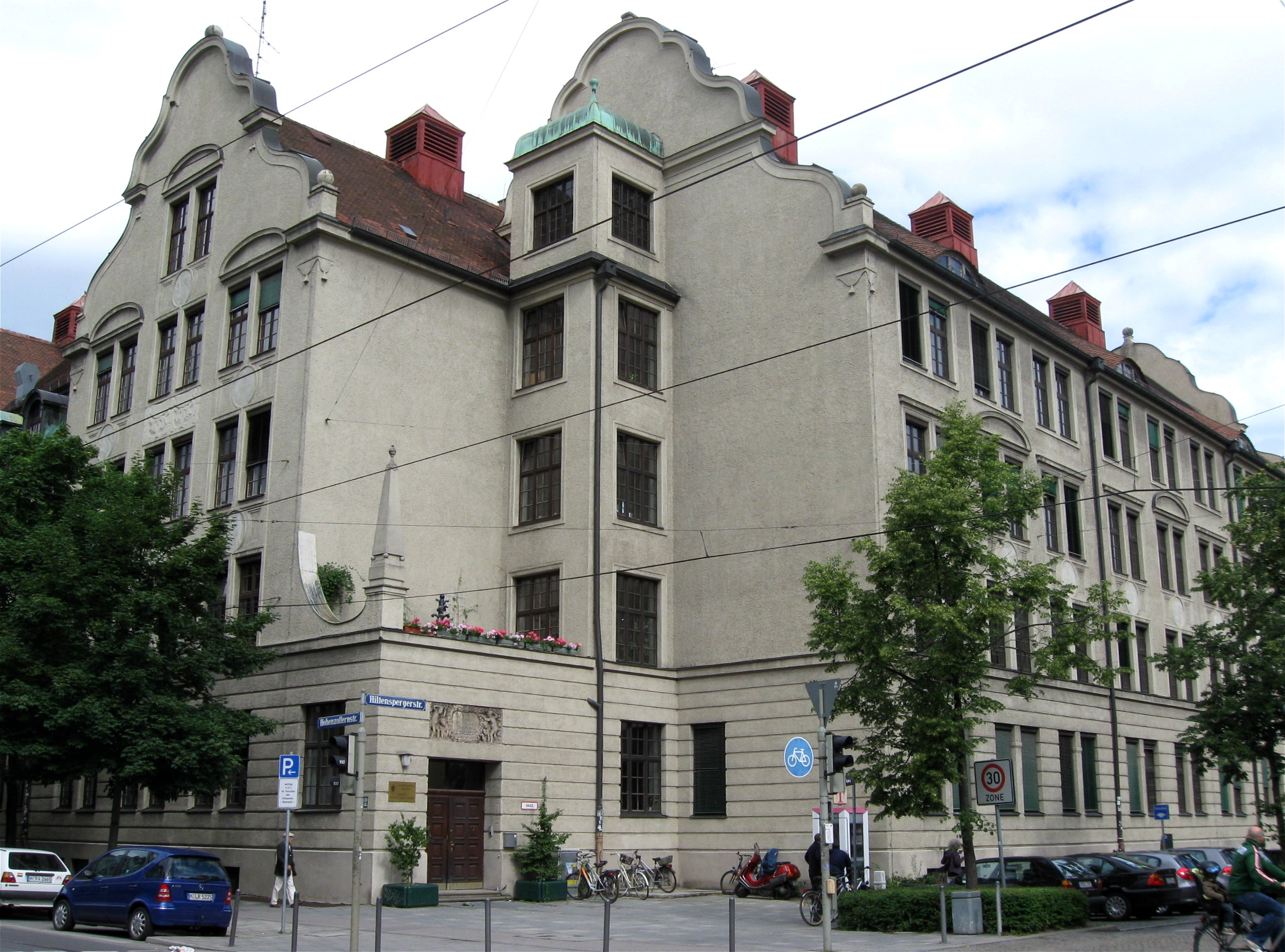
Städtische Hermann-Frieb-Realschule, Hohenzollernstraße 140

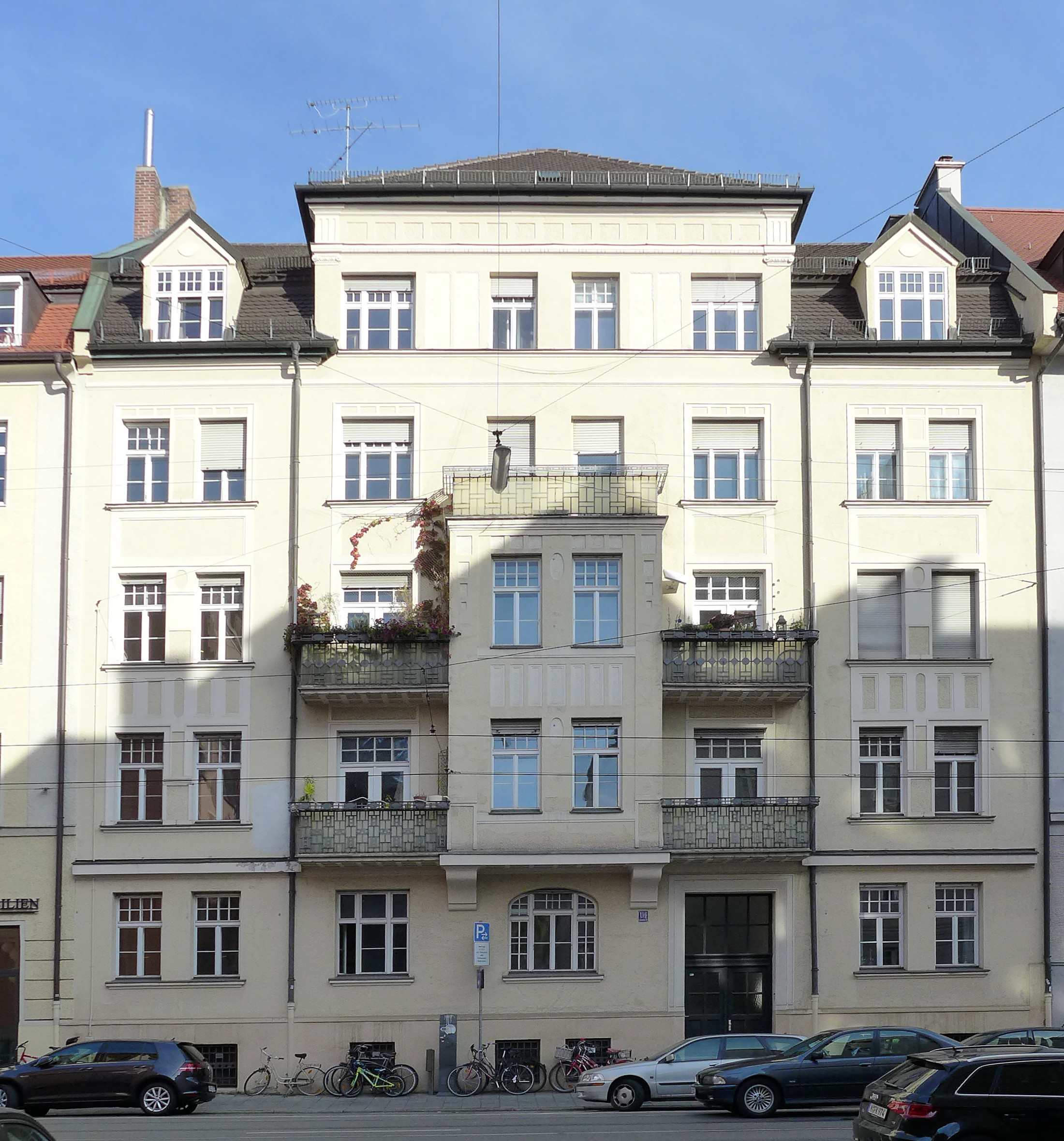
Hohenzollernstraße 116

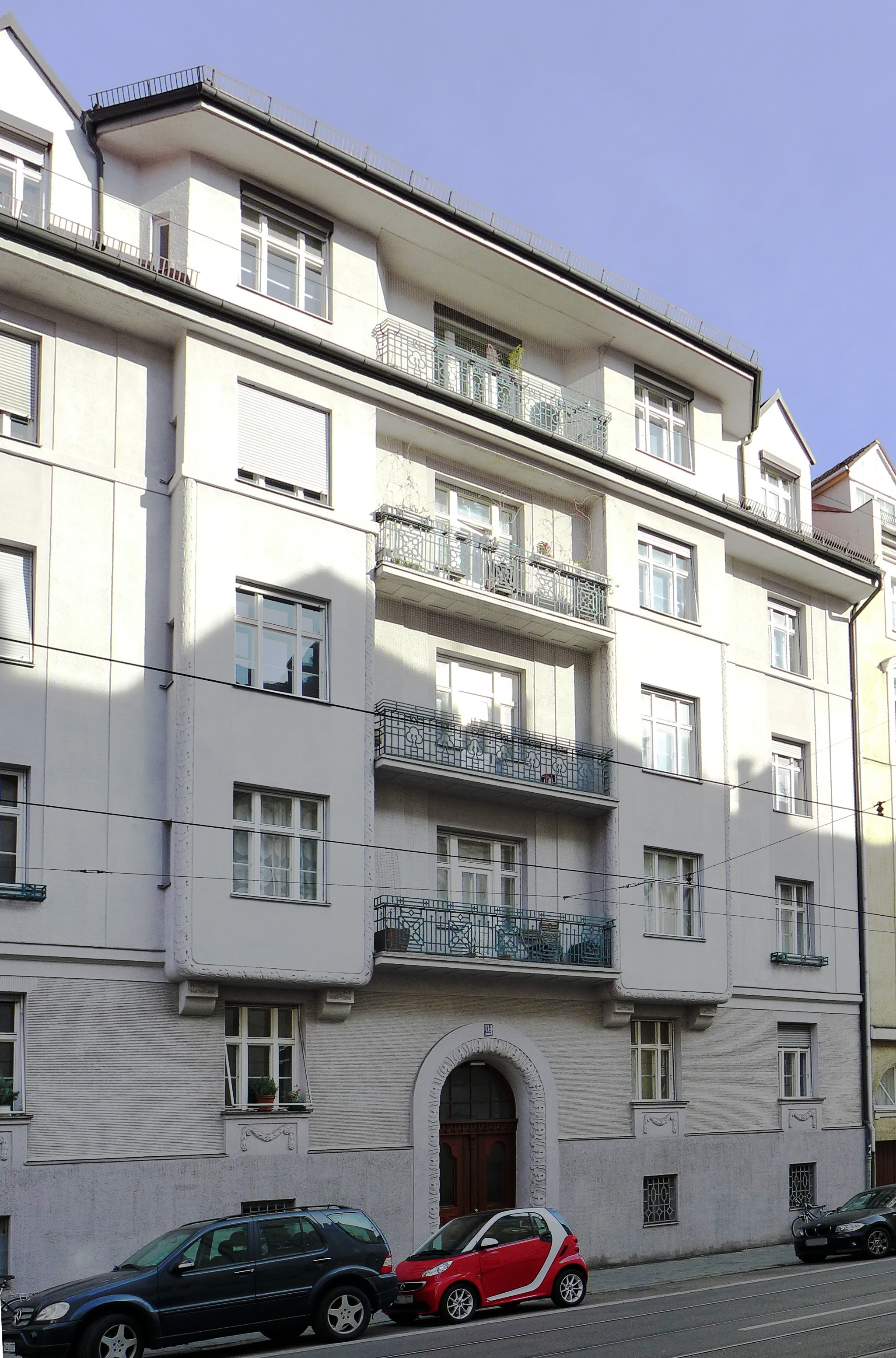
Hohenzollernstraße 114

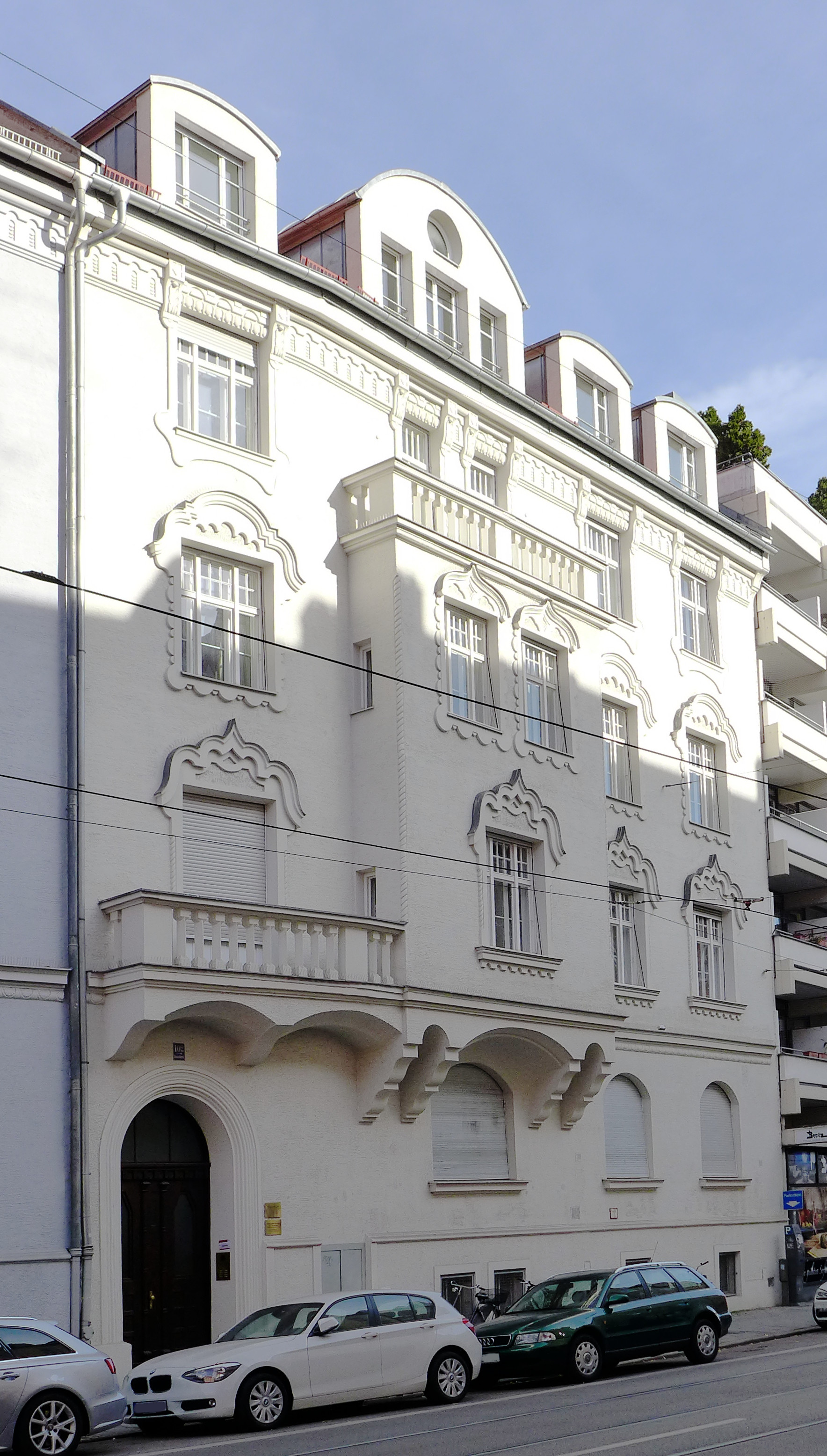
Hohenzollernstraße 102

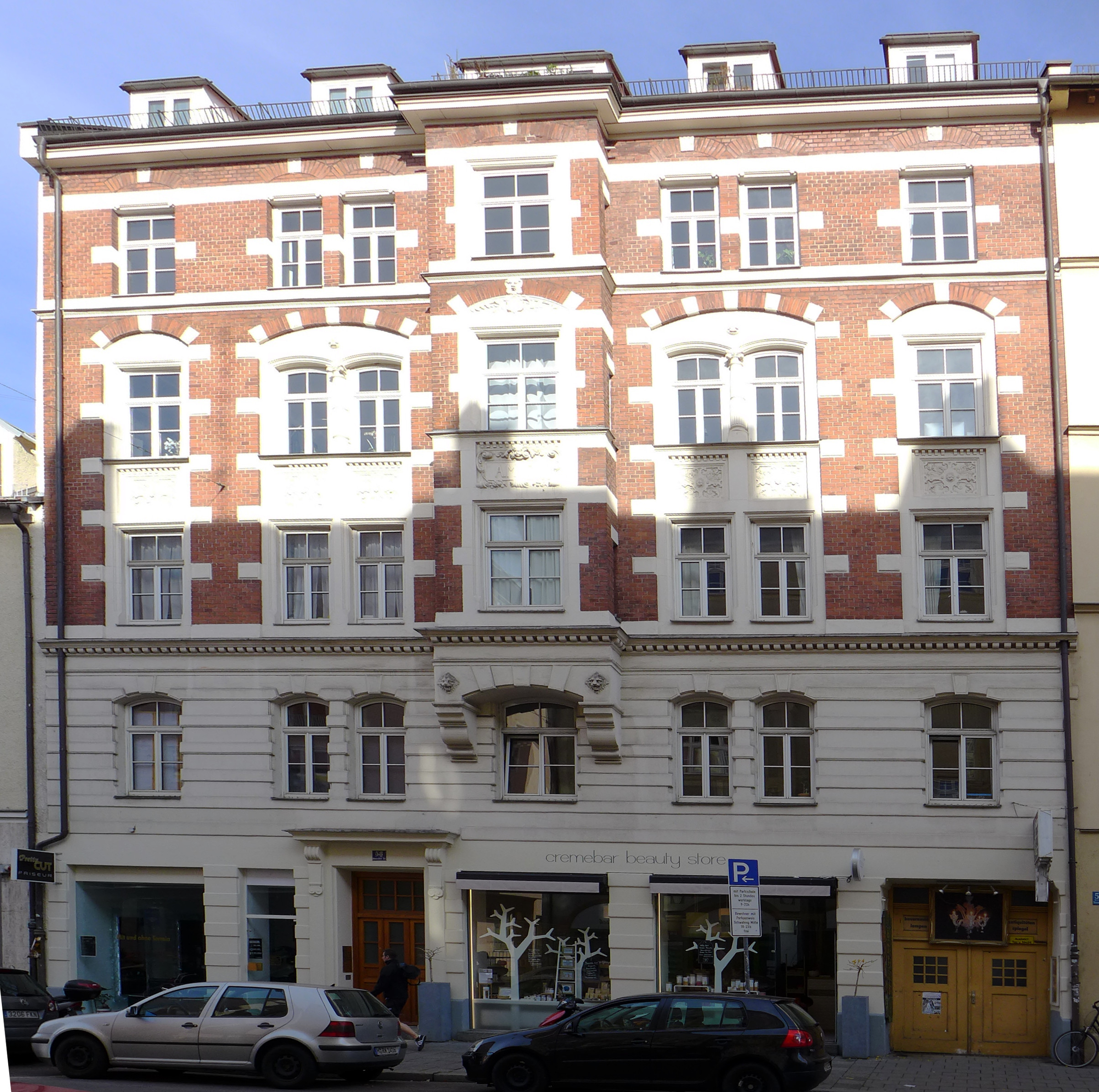
Hohenzollernstraße 58

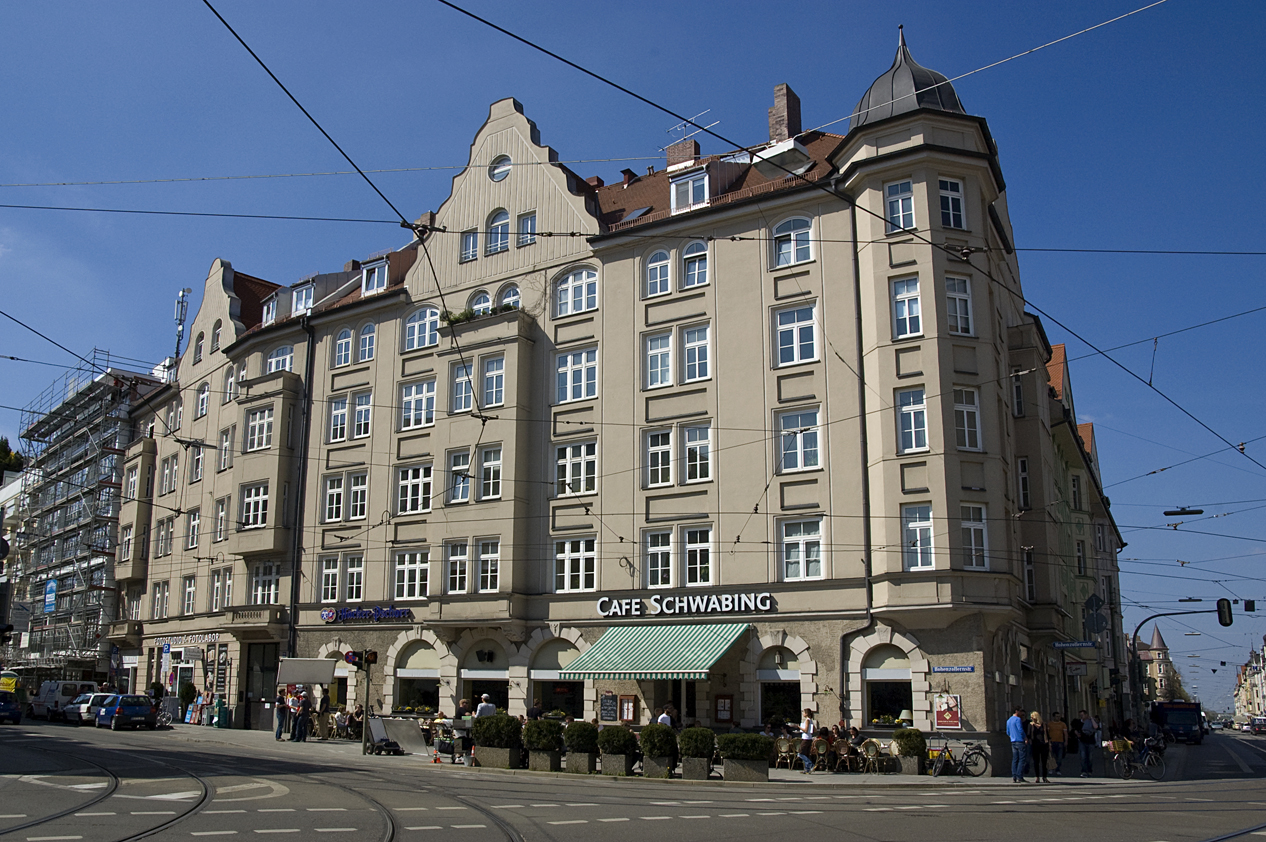
Cafe Schwabing

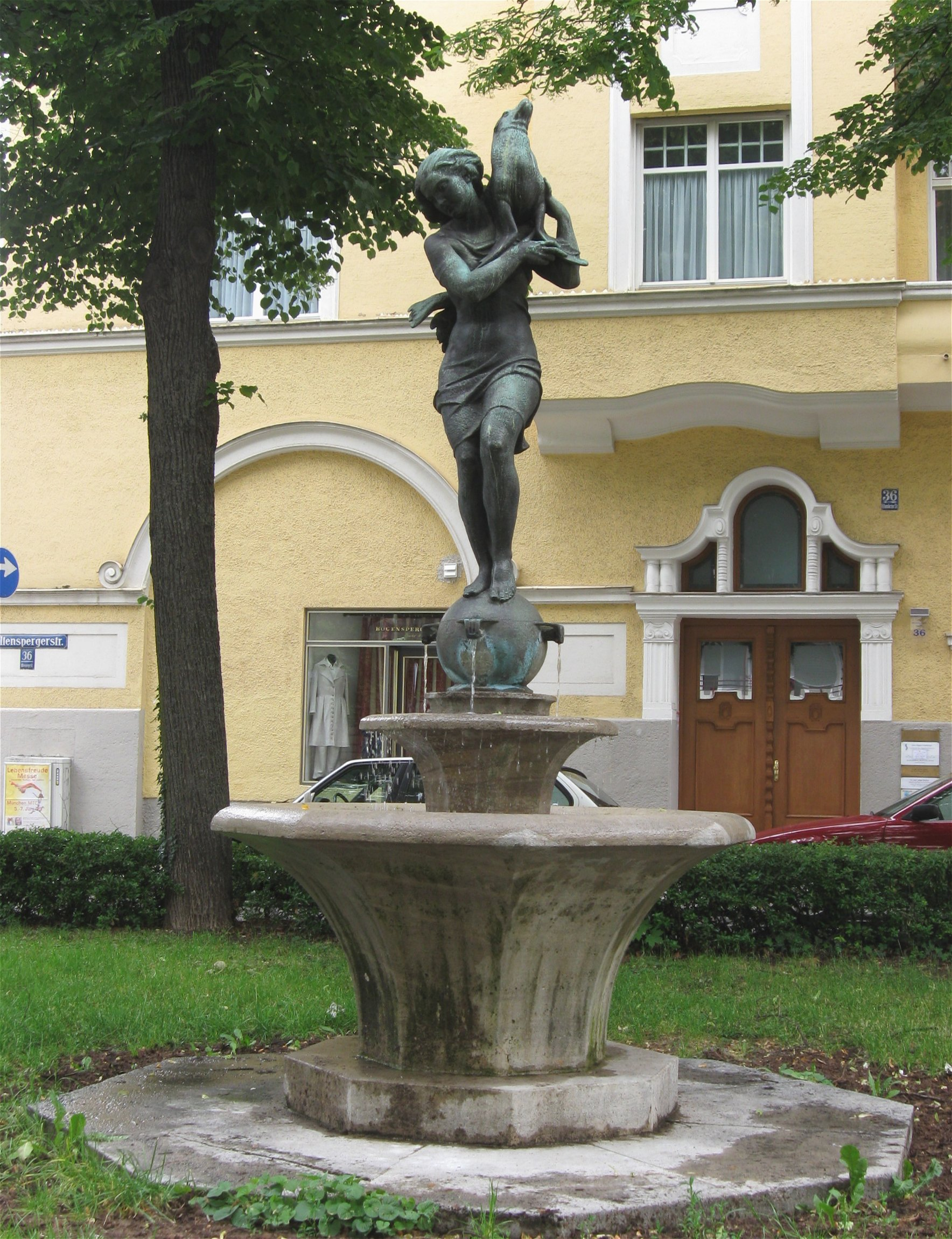
„Mädchen mit Seehund“, von Ferdinand Liebermann 1930, Hohenzollernplatz

== See also ==
- Schwere-Reiter-Straße
