= Kurfürstenplatz =

Square in Munich, Germany

Coordinates: 48.1599°N 11.5750°E

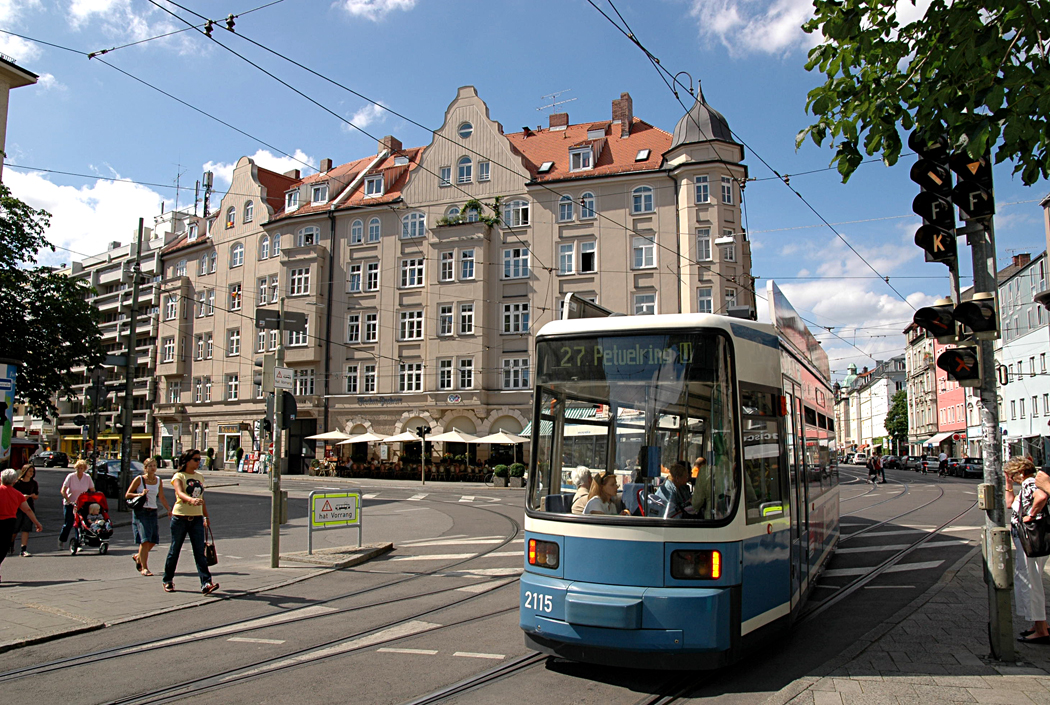
Tram 27 in front of the building erected by Xaver Heininger in 1898 at Belgradstraße 1

Kurfürstenplatz is a square in the Munich district of Schwabing and is located about two and a half kilometres north of the city centre. It is the intersection of several streets and tram lines and was built in 1915 and named after the Elector Maximilian II. Emanuel, born in Munich in 1662.

== Location ==
The Kurfürstenplatz is located in the centre of Schwabing and belongs to the district Schwabing-West. In the east–west direction Hohenzollernstraße runs across Kurfürstenplatz and crosses Schwabing over a length of about two kilometres. Belgradstraße branches off to the north, an approximately two-kilometre-long connection to the north forming section of the Mittlerer Ring. To the south, both Nordendstraße and Kurfürstenstraße branch off from Kurfürstenplatz and run parallel for almost one kilometre to Maxvorstadt in the south. Via Belgradstraße and Nordendstraße, road traffic flows from the northern district of Milbertshofen to Kurfürstenplatz and towards the city centre.

== History ==
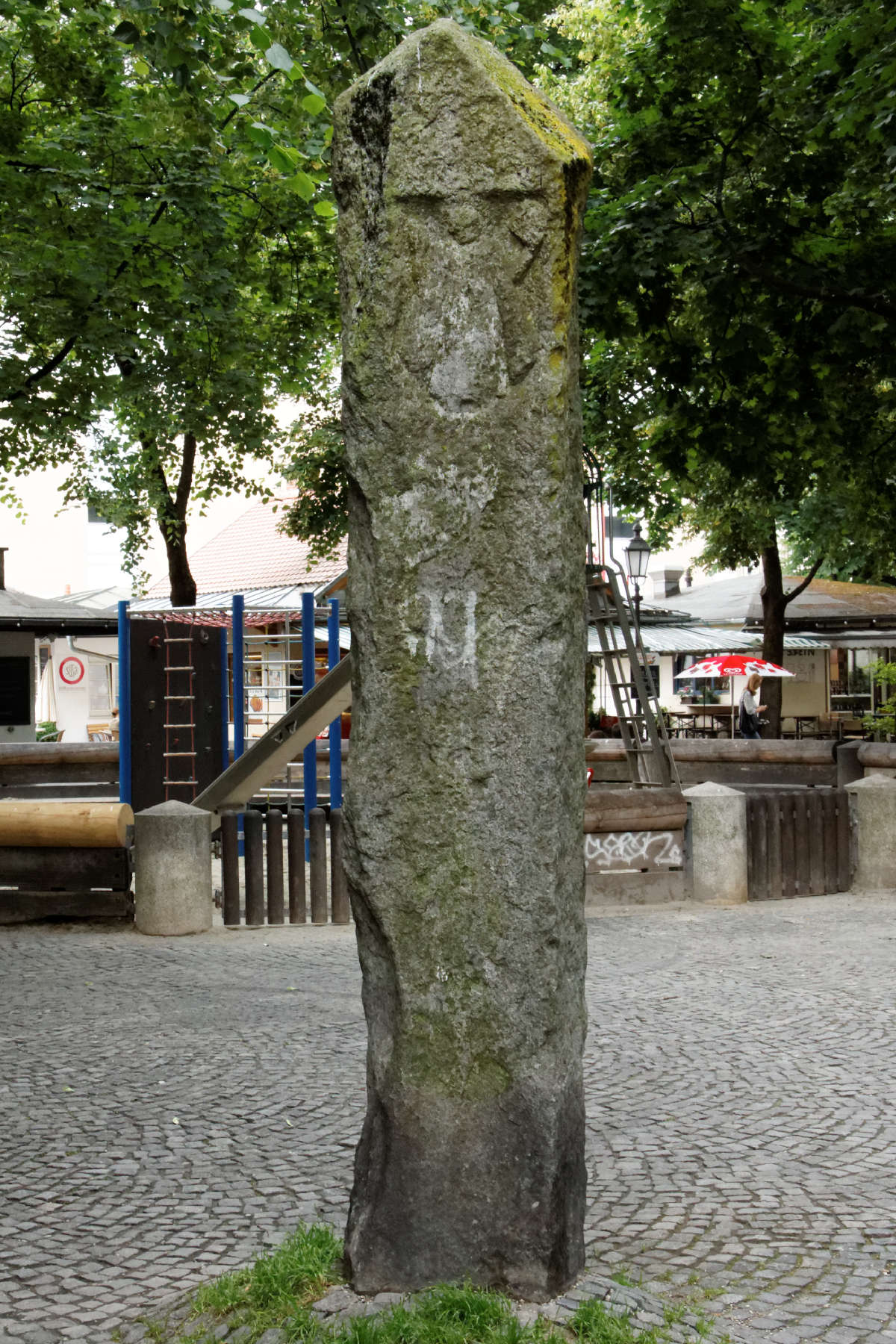
In the meantime the Burgfriedensäule has been moved to Elisabethplatz

Originally, the Burgfriedenssäule, which was probably erected in 1521, stood south of today's square and stands today on Elisabethplatz.

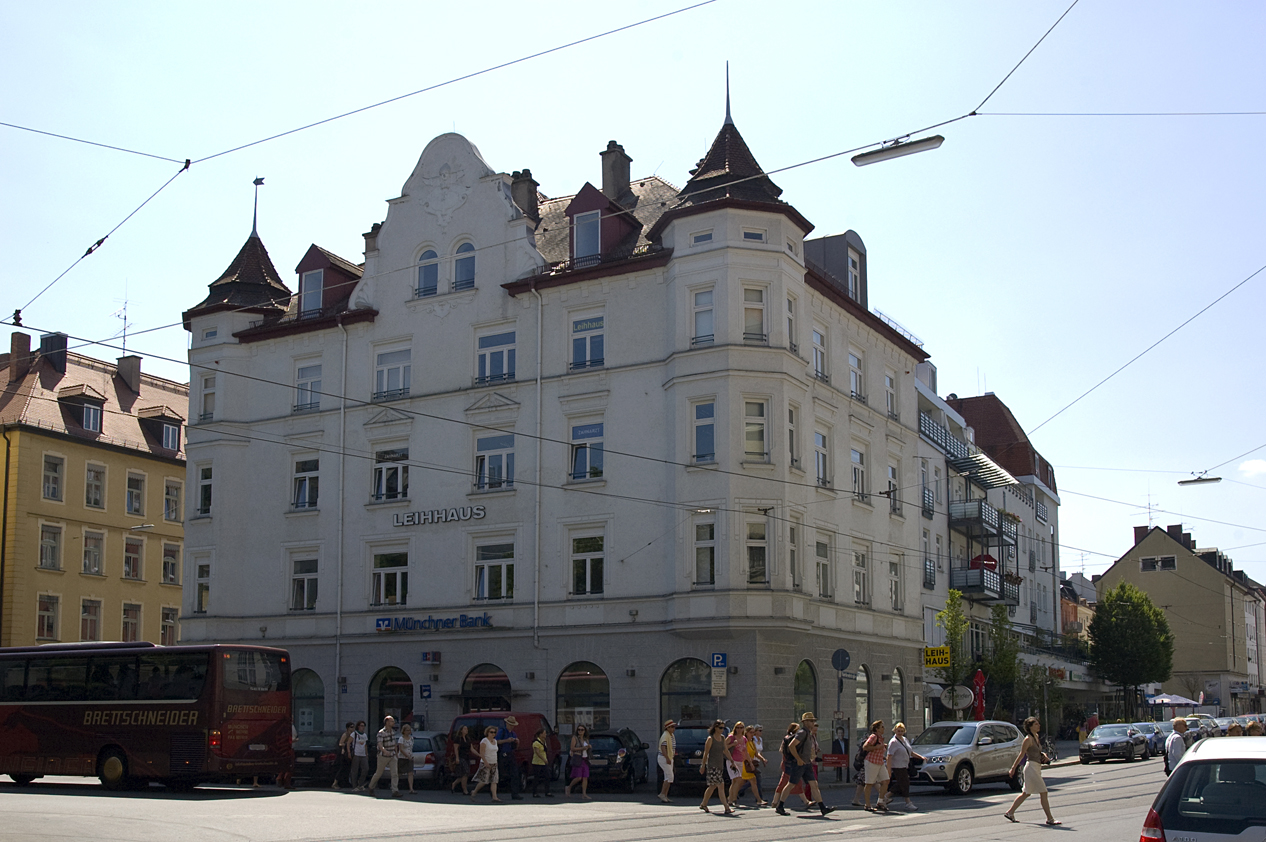
The residential building Nordendstraße 64, built by Paul Breitsameter in 1909, south of the Kurfürstenplatz

Although no historically listed building is located directly on Kurfürstenplatz, it is characterised by two listed buildings: The five-storey monumental corner apartment building at Belgradstraße 1/Hohenzollernstraße 86, which is located on the north side and on the ground floor of which the "Neuhauser" of the Hacker-Pschorr Brewery is located, was built in 1898 by Xaver Heininger in the forms of the German Renaissance with oriels, diaphragm gables and polygonal corner oriel with a bell roof and is a historically listed building. South of today's Kurfürstenplatz, the architect Paul Breitsameter built the neo-baroque apartment building at Nordendstraße 64 in 1909, a historically listed building, with two oriel towers at the corners and stucco decoration on the gable.

On 15 August 1900, the last horse-drawn tram left here travel along Hohenzollernstraße to Ludwigstraße Even before the First World War, the tram line from Kurfürstenplatz to Hohenzollernstraße and Tengstraße to Augustenstraße was laid out, therefore creating today's square. Therefore, in Oscar Brunn's (1853–1919) plan of Munich from 1914, only the intersection of Kurfürstenstraße and Belgradstraße to Hohenzollernstraße is shown. In 1915, the square was redesigned after Kurfürst Maximilian II. Emanuel. Already in the 1930s, the famous dance bar "Bohème-Diele" was located on the square, which was still a meeting place for artists for decades, later under the name "La Bohème".

At the time of National Socialism, the graduate engineer Hans Atzenbeck was commissioned to plan and execute a uniform square design through a closed development. Starting in 1938, the blocks of flats with 37 2½- to 3½-room flats, a savings bank branch, a police detachment with affiliated shops and a coffee house were built. After the Second World War, house number 5 was the location of the Municipal Police Office North of the then Munich City Police for a long time.

== Famous residents ==
The actress Ali Wunsch-König, lived on the first floor of the backyard garden house Kurfürstenplatz 2. She was the founder and director of the Neue Münchner Schauspielschule, which was also located there before it moved to the rooms at Dachauer Straße 15. Kurfürstenplatz 6 was the seat of the artists' group Der Rote Reiter.

== Transportation connection ==
The three tram lines 12, 27 and 28 runs across Kurfürstenplatz, the former connecting Scheidplatz in the north of Schwabing with Romanplatz in the west of the city not far from Nymphenburg Palace. Lines 27 from Petuelring and 28 from Scheidplatz connect the north of Schwabing with the city centre. In addition, two metro bus lines run at Kurfürstenplatz, which run right across the city.
