= Ritterwerk =

German appliance company

Ritterwerk GmbH
- Type: GmbH
- Industry: Household appliances
- Founded: 1905; 121 years ago Munich, Germany
- Founder: Franz Ritter
- Headquarters: Gröbenzell, Germany
- Key people: Michael Schüller
- Products: Household appliances
- Website: www.rittwerk.de/en

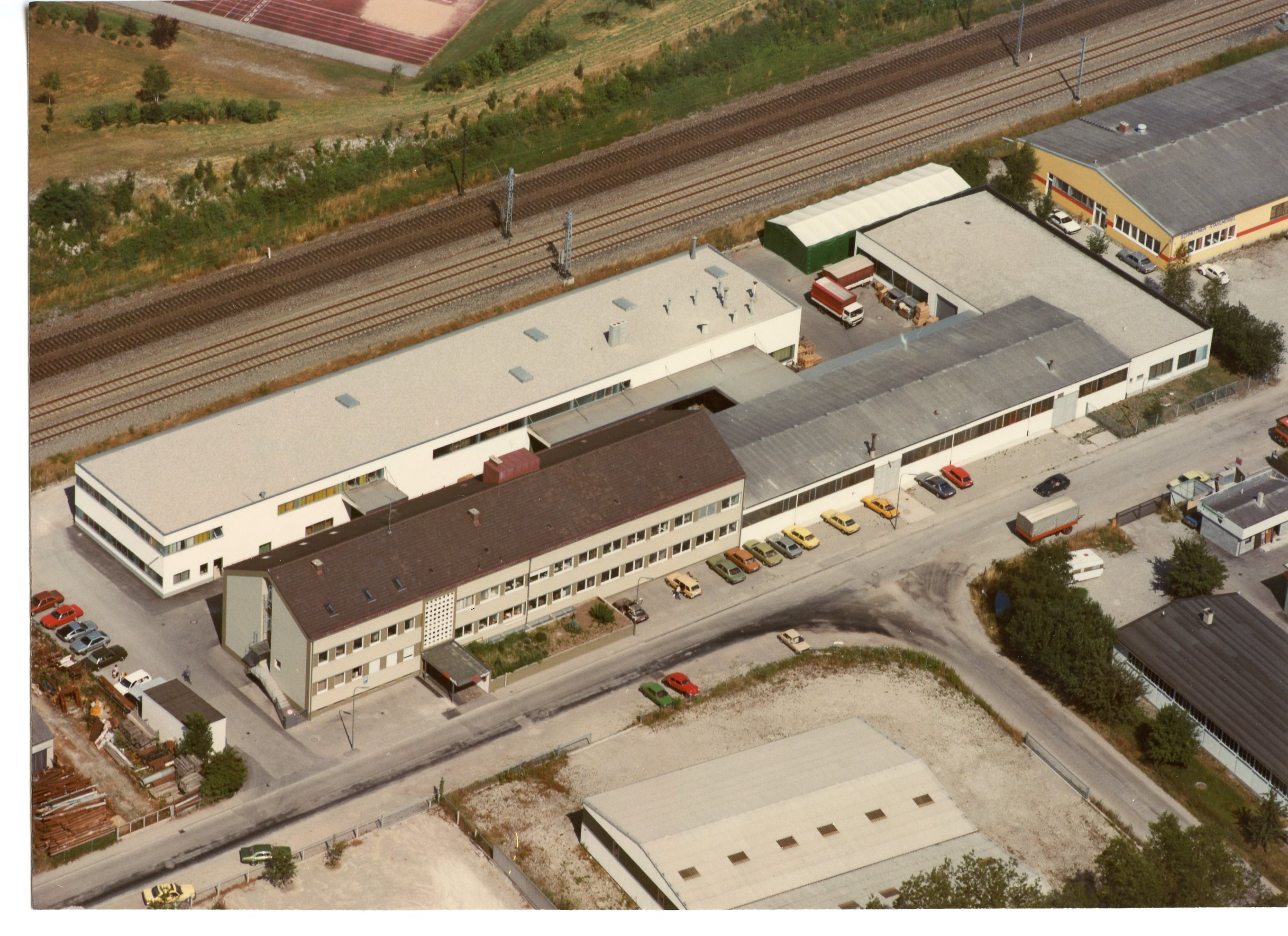
Aerial image of Ritterwerk GmbH in Gröbenzell, near Munich

Ritterwerk GmbH is a German company founded by Franz Ritter in 1905 in Sendling, a suburb of Bavaria’s capital Munich. The company develops, designs and produces tabletop and built-in household appliances in Gröbenzell near Munich.

== History ==
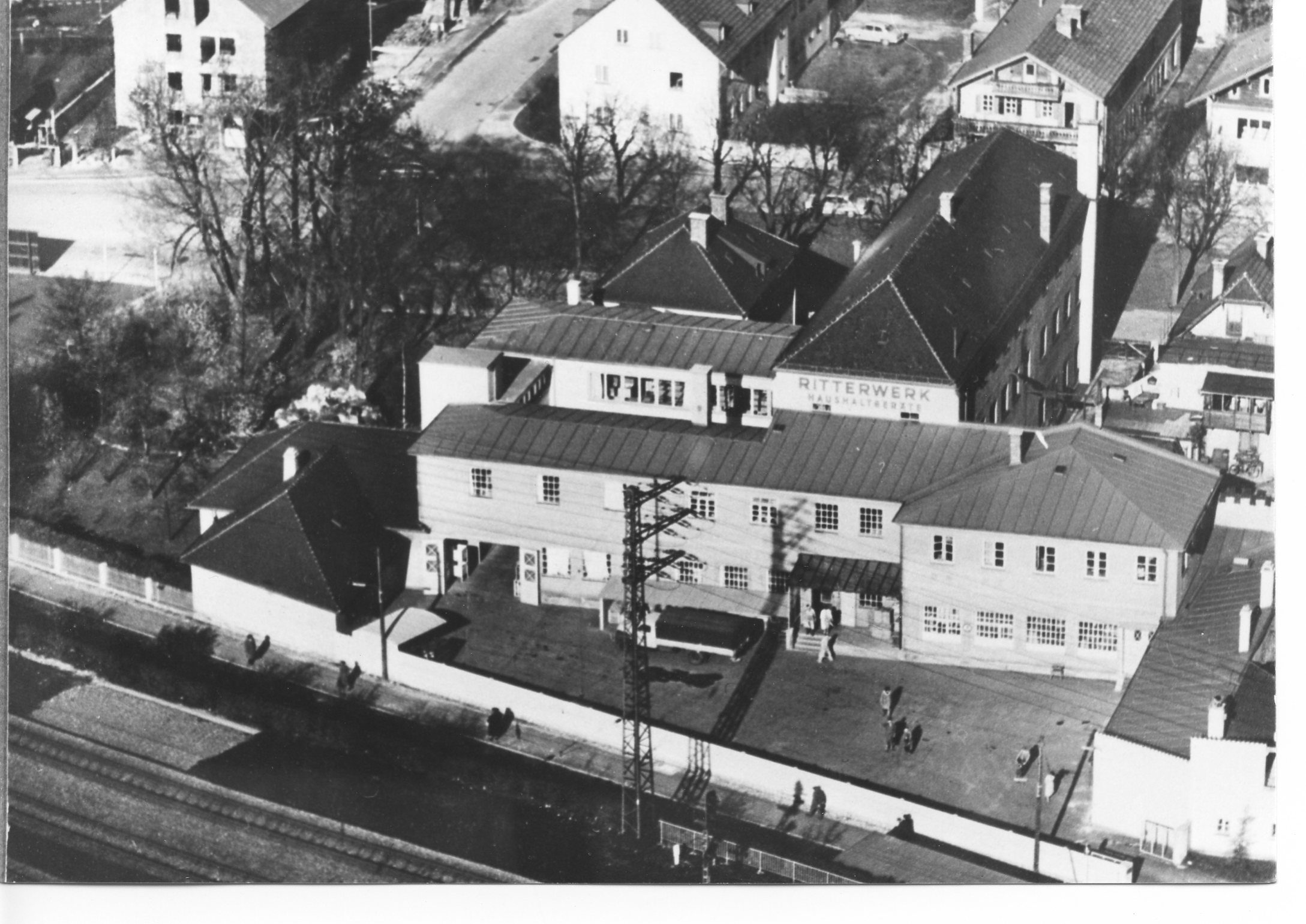
Former production site in Pasing, today Pasinger Fabrik

The company was founded in Sendling in 1905 under the name of “F. Ritter & Sohn.” During the first few years, founder Franz Ritter and his son developed an appliance for removing rust from cutlery. In most conformable devices, leather was used to get the knives clean, which often led to dissected blades. Ritter used special brushes in his machines which ensured that the cutlery remained intact. The company took out a patent for its “Bürsten-Messerputz-Maschine” (“brushes knife-cleaning machine”). Due to the increasing corporate growth, the company moved to Pasing in 1912. From the year 1914 to the late 1920s, the company grew from 25 employees to 130. Starting in 1915 and during most of World War I, it was forced to produce cartouches for grenades instead of household appliances. Afterward, the regular production was resumed and at the beginning of 1920, more than 100,000 Bürsten-Messerputz-Maschinen were sold.

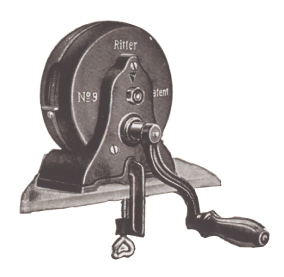
Knife-cleaning machine n°9

The number of employees sank rapidly to only six as a direct result of the Great Depression in 1928/29. The Bürsten-Messerputz-Maschine became more and more insignificant due to the availability of stainless steel. Therefore, Franz Ritter developed other appliances as an alternative to his first device. One of them – the first one – was the bread slicer B50 which was operated by hand and launched in 1932. Over the next few years, he successfully filed for patents for various other devices. When company founder Franz Ritter died in 1938, his daughter and his son in law Hans Koch took over leadership and carried on with Ritter’s work. During World War II, the production of household appliances stopped again and the company was strained to try to keep up with gas mask production.

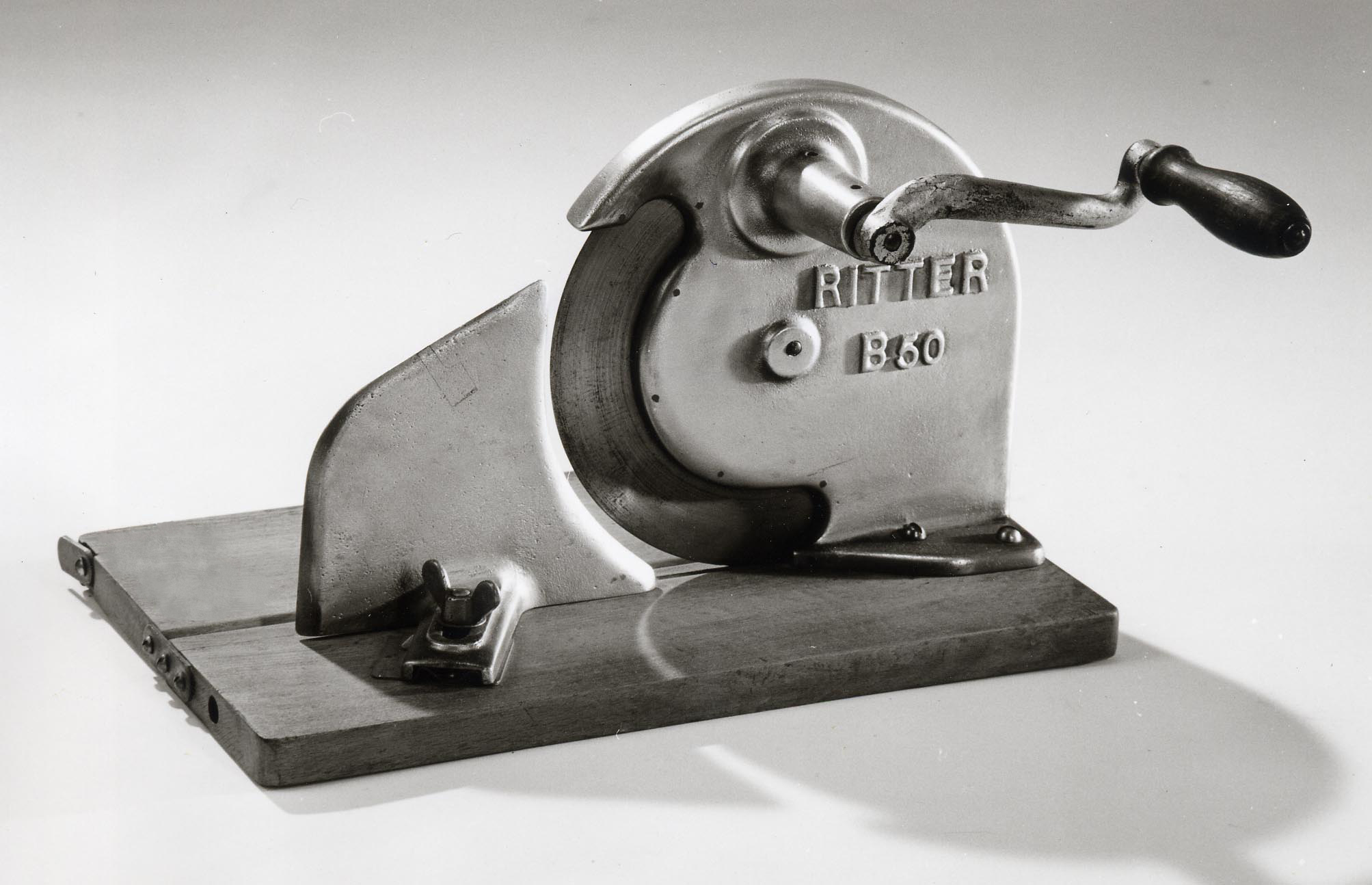
Food slicer B 50

In the aftermath of World War II, the company continued producing bread slicers and other gadgets for housekeeping and kitchen. In 1949, the Schneidboy (“slicing boy” with five circular blades for slicing mainly vegetables) was presented to the public for the first time – it was awarded the iF product design award and was sold more than 10 million times.

The first electrical food slicer, as well as the first built-in food slicer, were introduced to the market in 1968 – both went into production still that year. In 1969, Hans Koch retired, which led to the company’s reorganization and its selling to the owner of Braun, a manufacturer of electrical appliances. A couple of years later, the company changed its name to Ritterwerk GmbH. Because the company building in Pasing became too small in 1982, Ritterwerk and its 150 employees moved to Gröbenzell near Munich. The company’s former factory halls were turned into the cultural center Pasinger Fabrik, which is still frequently visited as of today.

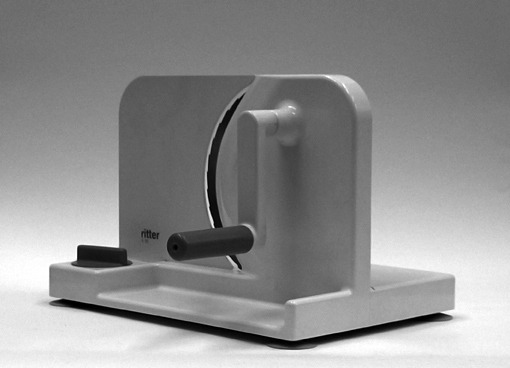
Food slicer A5

Ritterwerk constantly takes part in various international products -as well as design fairs – like the Interior Lifestyle or the consumer goods fair ambiente. The household appliances by Ritterwerk GmbH are frequently exhibited in national and international museums for everyday culture and design, such as the Red Dot Design Museum in Singapore, the Red Dot Design Museum in Essen, the Deutsches Historisches Museum in Berlin, the Grassi Museum of Applied Arts in Leipzig and the Museum of Applied Arts in Cologne.

== Appliances ==
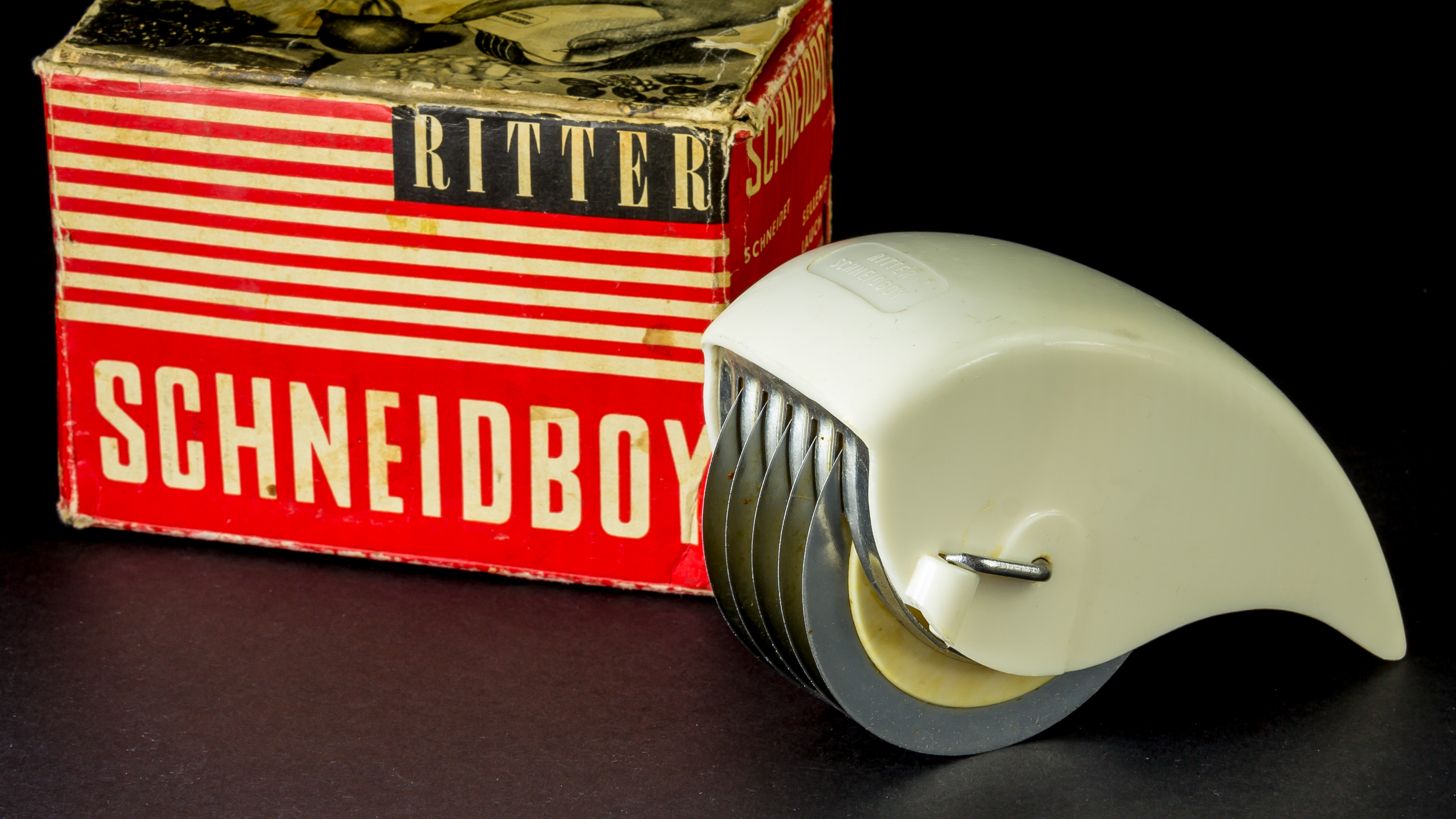
Schneidboy with the original packaging

During the years 1930-1950, the company’s product range was characterized by crank handled bread slicers that have been produced with great success since the early 1930s. Various small appliances such as strawberry tongs, a cutter for radish, a cube slicer for vegetables and bread, the Schneid- and Fleischboy (“slicing boy” with five serrated circular blades for slicing meat) or the lemon wedge squeezer which was used in tea- and coffeehouses all over the world were introduced as well. Since 1968, Ritterwerk GmbH has been developing and producing electrical household appliances that – due to their space-saving design – can also be integrated in kitchen drawers. Other than household appliances and built-in systems for kitchen drawers, the company also produces devices such as the Ritter peeler which gained popularity especially in Asia (e.g. Japan) and is sold more than 100,000 times every year.

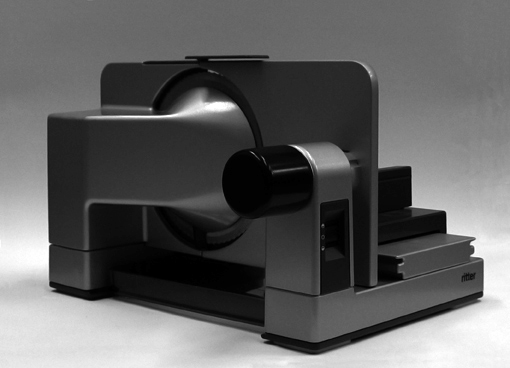
Food slicer E30

Over the years, food slicers for both tabletop and built-in systems became more and more popular. Product designer Karl Dittert created many appliances for the company. All of them reflect the functionality and style of the Bauhaus of the 1920s and have won several design-oriented awards. Appliances by Ritterwerk GmbH are produced exclusively in Germany, which are constituting a unique selling point in the world of household devices.

Since 2010, industrial designer Martin Dettinger has taken over responsibility for the product design of ritter appliances. Currently, the company produces kitchen devices such as food slicers, toaster, kettle, coffee machine as well as a cordless hand blender – most of those devices are also available as complete built-in systems.

== Awards (variety) ==
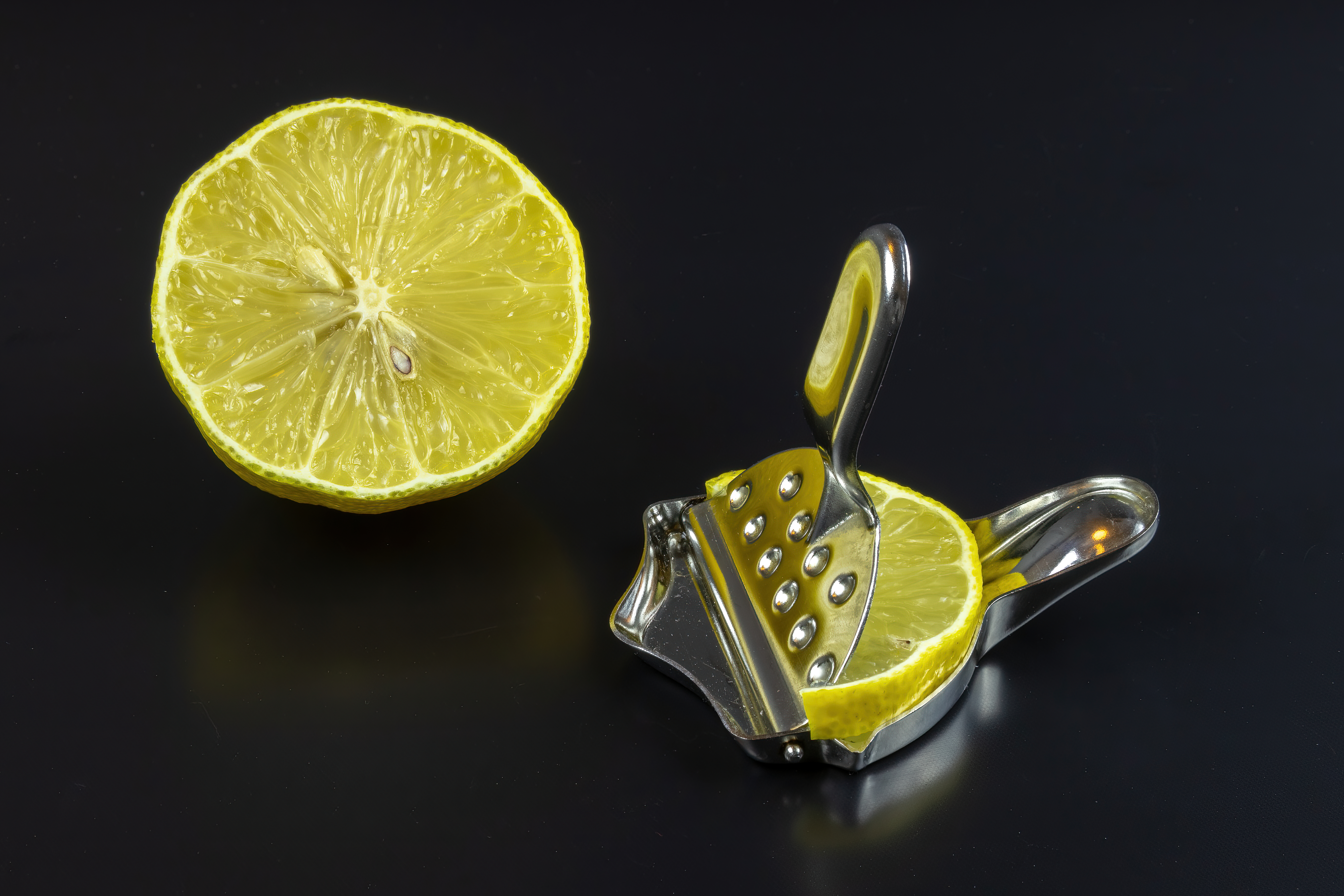
Ritter lemon slice squeezer

- 1955 iF product design award (Schneidboy)
- 1955 iF product design award (food slicer B 70)
- 1973/1974/1975 design center stuttgart
- 1979 Bundespreis „Gute Form“ (built-in food-slicer E 22 vario)
- 1982 design center stuttgart „Deutsche Auswahl 1982“ (food slicer E 30 vario electronic)
- 1985 Design Zentrum Nordrhein Westfalen (food slicer E 25)
- 1986 design center stuttgart „Deutsche Auswahl 1986“ (electro-food-slicer E 23 metal)
- 1987 Haus Industrieform Essen Design-Innovationen ´87 (food slicer E 23 metal)
- 2001 interzum award (built-in food-slicer AES 62)
- 2002 Internationaler Designpreis Baden-Württemberg (E 21 Freischneider Diagonal)
- 2005 TOP 100
- 2008 red dot design award (food slicer contura3)
- 2011 iF product design award (toaster volcano5)
- 2011 IHK Ausbildungspreis Dachau-Fürstenfeldbruck 2011
- 2013 red dot design award (kettle fontana5)
- 2014 The Blue Angel (toaster volcano5, toaster volcano3, built-in toaster ET 10, kettle fontana5)
- 2015 iF DESIGN AWARD (kettle fontana5)
- 2015 iF DESIGN AWARD (food slicer icaro7)
- 2015 Red Dot Award: Product Design (food slicer sono5)
- 2016 The Blue Angel (coffee machine cafena5)
- 2018 The Blue Angel (kettle fontana5)
- 2018 The Blue Angel (toaster volcano5)
