= Pasinger Fabrik =

Cultural center in Munich, Germany

Coordinates: 48°09′03″N 11°27′42″E

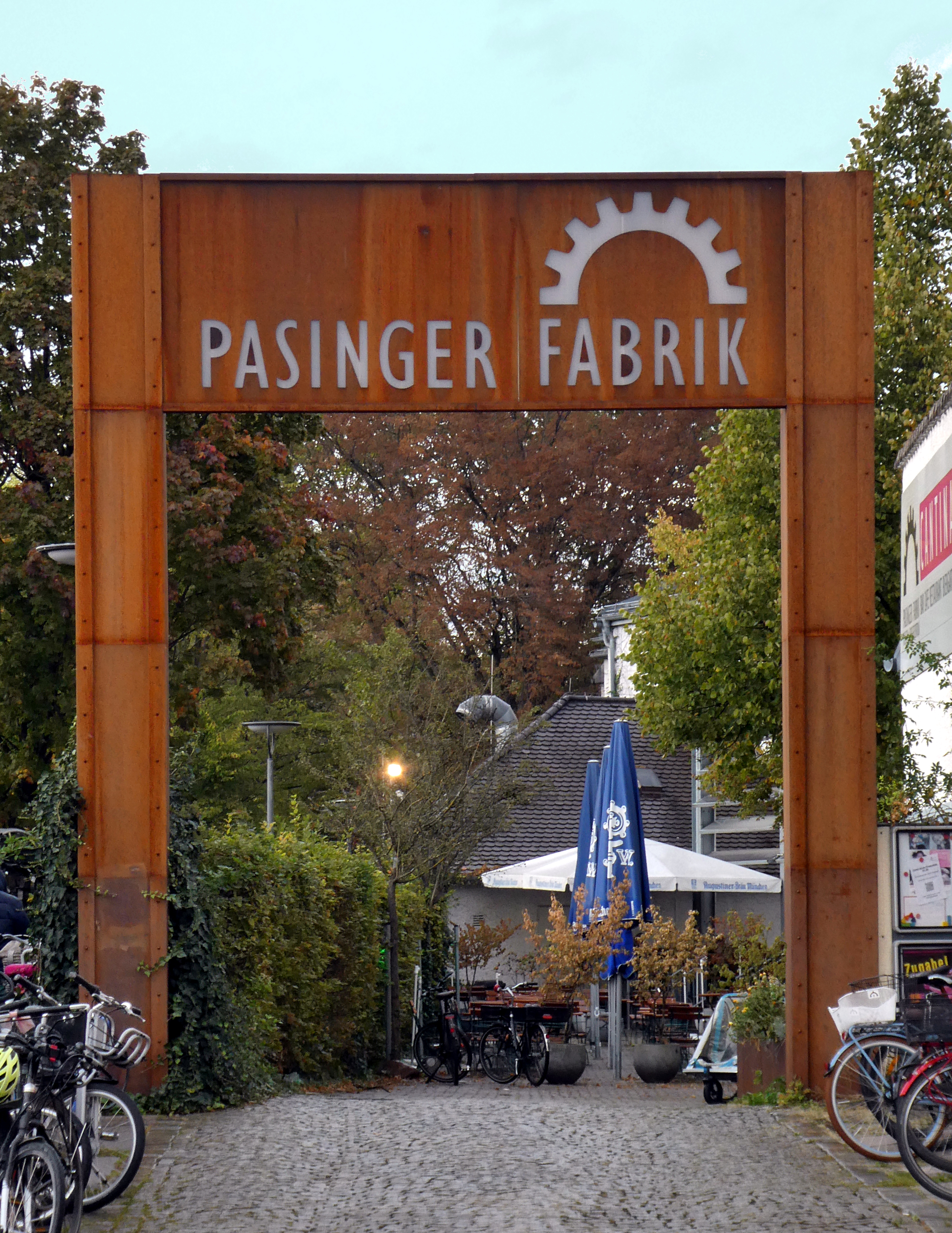
Pasinger Fabrik, entrance

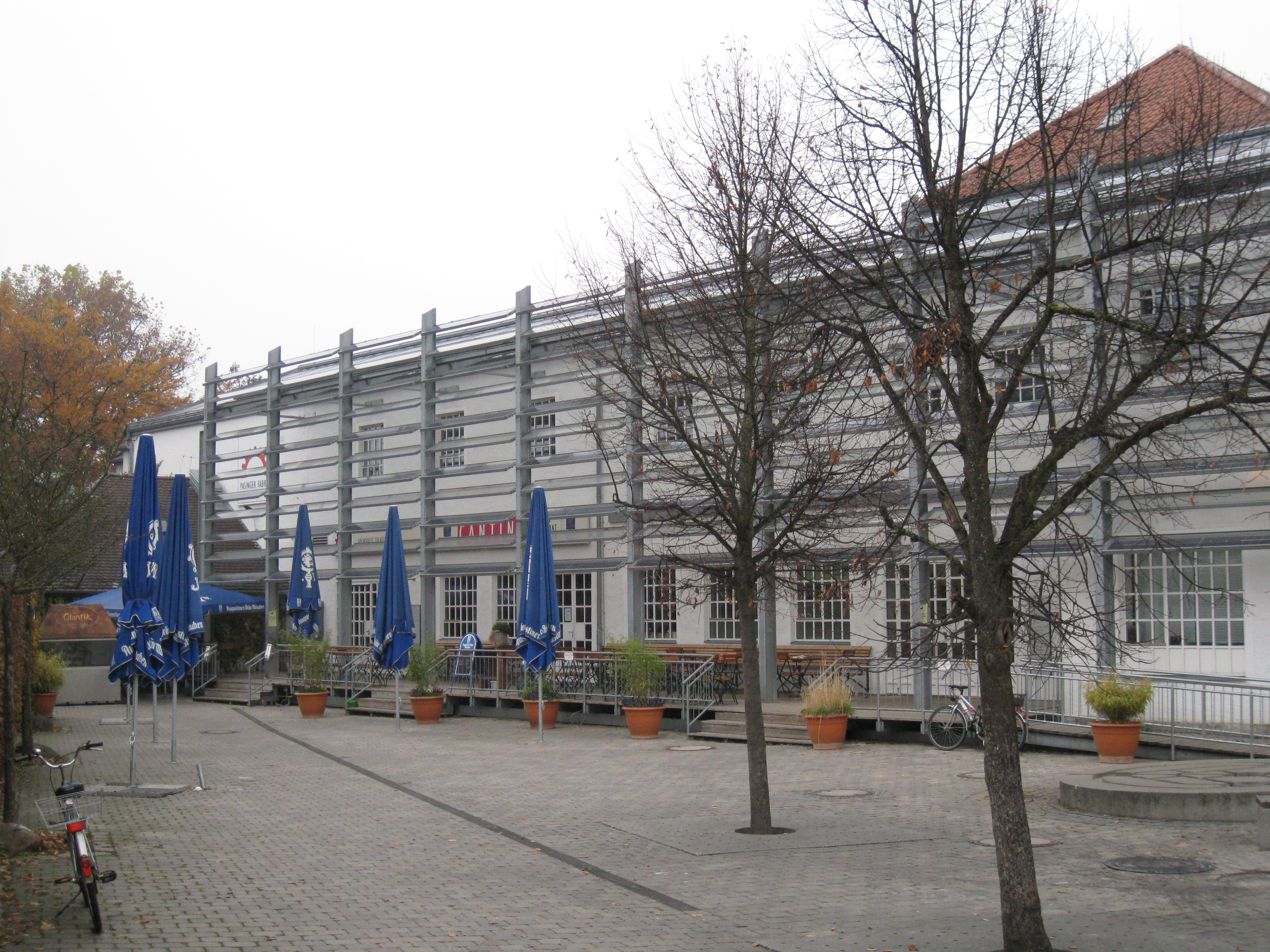
Pasinger Fabrik, front view

Pasinger Fabrik is a former factory in Munich, Bavaria, Germany, which is currently used as a cultural centre and event venue. It is located in Pasing, a quarter in the western part of Munich.

== History ==
The industrial buildings of Pasinger Fabrik were built in 1895 by the German architect August Exter. Originally, it was used as a manufacturing plant by the Heymann shoe factory, which produced leather shoes. After a fire in 1904, the household appliances manufacturer Ritter acquired the factory. In 1986, the city of Munich bought the buildings to use them for new purposes.

== Cultural Centre ==
Pasinger Fabrik functions as a cultural centre, featuring the VIEL LÄRM UM NICHTS theatre, a restaurant, and a bar that regularly hosts concerts. It also offers various projects catering to children, adolescents, and families.

The cultural centre presents a diverse range of programs, including performances by theatre groups, comedians, political satirists, and musicians from different genres. Its large gallery frequently showcases temporary exhibitions. Additionally, Pasinger Fabrik houses Munich's smallest opera house, which annually stages one or two operas or operettas specifically adapted for a small cast and orchestra.

== Theatre Viel Lärm um Nichts ==
The theatre VIEL LÄRM UM NICHTS (named after Shakespeare's play Much Ado About Nothing) has made an essential contribution to the development of Pasinger Fabrik into the cultural centre it is today.

The theatre was founded by the German actors Margit Carls and Andreas Seyferth in 1985. After working in state and municipal theatres for several years, they decided to set up their own theatre in order to combine the quality you can find in these theatres with a more autonomous, individualistic and collective way of producing.

Such an approach is characteristic for German ‘off-theatres’ or ‘free theatres’, which, similarly to fringe theatres, stand for experimental and unconventional performances. Free theatres usually have much smaller budgets than state and municipal theatres (the most dominant theatre categories in Germany), which rely heavily on public funding. Nevertheless, some free theatres also receive public funding; the city of Munich has supported the theatre VIEL LÄRM UM NICHTS since their first production, for example.

The repertoire of the theatre VIEL LÄRM UM NICHTS consists mainly of their own translations and versions of classic plays. Moreover, dramatisations of narrative texts are frequently performed. Characteristically, the theatre experiments with new stage concepts instead of performing on the usual proscenium stage.

In 1996 as well as in 1997, the theatre was listed as one of the 10 best off-theatres in the German-speaking area by the Impulse Theater Festival in Germany.
