= Rohrer & Brammer =

Theatre in Munich, Bavaria

Coordinates: 48°09′40″N 11°34′33″E

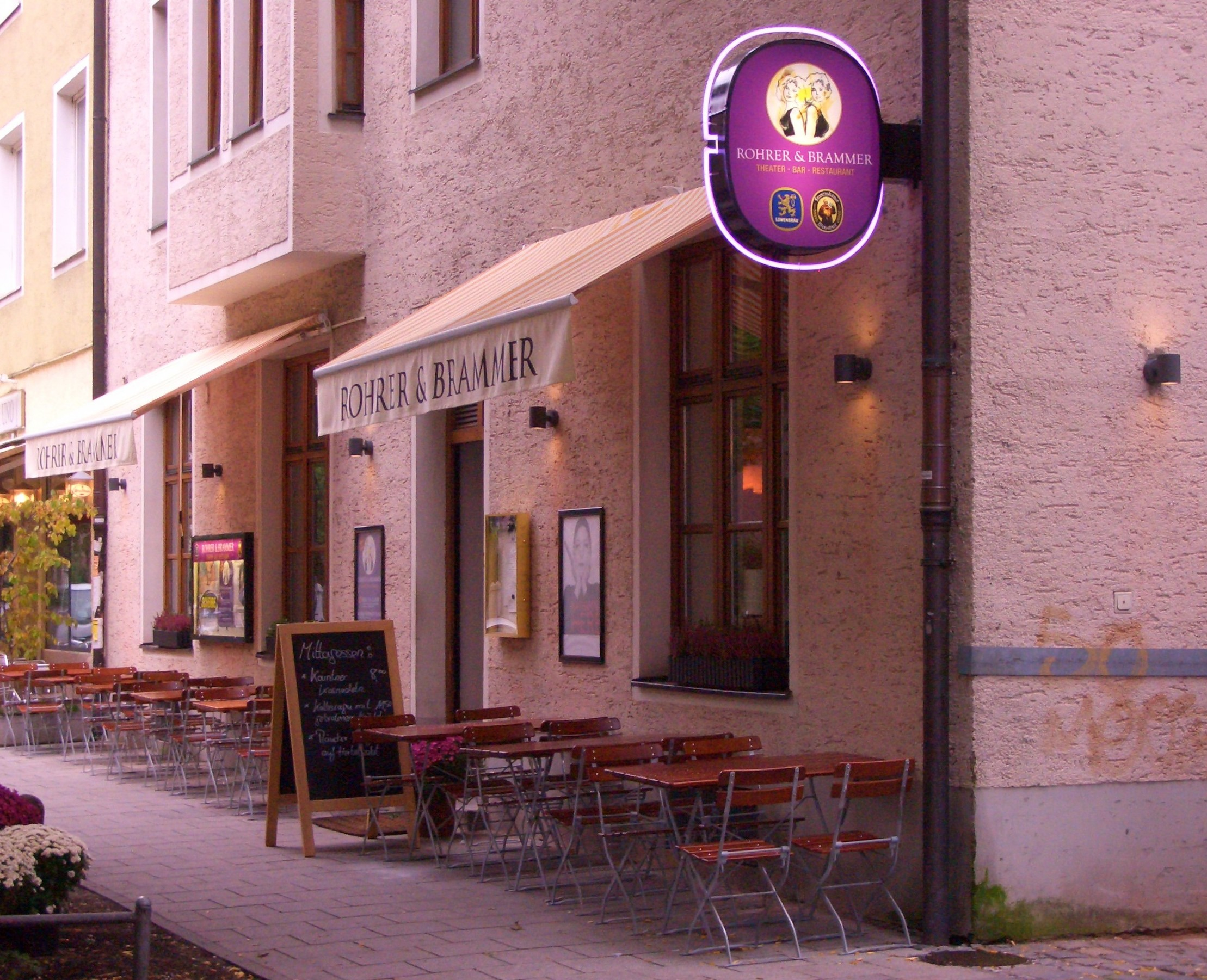
Entrance to the restaurant

Rohrer & Brammer was a private theatre with an attached restaurant in Munich, Bavaria, Germany. It was closed in May 2010.
