= Impulse Theater Festival =

The International Impulse Theater Festival (until 2011 Theater Festival Impulse) presents productions of the independent theatre scene of Germany, Austria and Switzerland. The Festival was founded in 1990 by Dietmar N. Schmidt and directed by him until 2006. It shows remarkable productions of the independent theatre in the German-speaking world (2007 to 2013 biennial) and since its foundation in 1990 has become an important platform for independent, experimental theatre.

The Impulse Theater Festival has been held in several cities in North Rhine-Westphalia since its establishment, currently in Düsseldorf, Cologne and Mülheim an der Ruhr. Since 2015, the festival, which has been held biennially from 2009 to 2013, takes place annually. The main program will now be presented in one of the partner cities, while the other two will be present as satellites with special contexts. The organizer is the NRW Culture Secretariat. Since 2013, Florian Malzacher has been the artistic director.

== Focus and concept ==
Since 2013, the festival has been organized under the artistic direction of Florian Malzacher. Thus, the focus shifted away from a pure best-sighted view to more curatorially motivated links and thematic questions. The selection and prize jury was abolished, an open call and an artistic advisory council supported the programming. In essence, there are about ten invitations to outstanding works by artists with a food point in German-speaking countries. They are supplemented by commissioned works developed by international artists in the partner cities - among others. Yael Bartana, Phil Collins, Ahmet Öğüt and Lotte van den Berg.

== Artistic council ==
Also since 2013 Impulse has been accompanied by an advisory board of science and art. In 2013, the advisory board included the curator Ellen Blumenstein, the ethnologist Thomas Hauschild, the theatre scientist Hans-Thies Lehmann, the founding director of the Max Planck Institute for Empirical Aesthetics and the comparatist Winfried Menninghaus. For the 2015 edition, the Kunsthistorikerin and curator Beatrice von Bismarck, the philosopher Boris Buden as well as the sociologist Oliver Marchart form the advisory council.

== History ==
=== 1992 to 2006 ===
In 1992, the director of the NRW cultural secretaries in Wuppertal, Dietmar N. Schmidt founded the Impulse theatre festival as a theatrical meeting of the free scene. Every year, outstanding theatrical productions of free groups and theatre were presented. Up until 2006 under Schmidt's direction, a jury of experts nominated the best theatrical work of the scene every year.

=== 2007 to 2011 ===
Between 2007 and 2011, the former theatre director and cultural producer Tom Stromberg took over the artistic direction of the festival together with the director and festival director Matthias von Hartz. In a two-year rhythm, the festival presented new aesthetic and contextual positions within the German-speaking free theatre. The festival showed outstanding productions and co-productions from the German-speaking theatre. Among the two introduced innovations were the Special Guests. International theatrical productions that complemented the festival program as well as a visitor program for international curators, which was aimed at the international marketing of the shown productions and the German scene.

=== Orientation and concept since 2018 ===
In 2018, Haiko Pfost took over the artistic direction of the festival. The curator and dramaturge has been shaping the festival since the first edition for which he was responsible, with three program focuses that rotate annually through the venues in Cologne, Düsseldorf, and Mülheim an der Ruhr: "Showcase," "City Project," and "Academy." The institutional partners and thus central venues in the respective cities are Ringlokschuppen Ruhr (Mülheim an der Ruhr), Forum Freies Theater (Düsseldorf), and studiobühneköln (Cologne).

In the "Showcase" the guest performances selected by the Impulse advisory board are shown. Presented are "challenging works that represent a variety of different theater forms and aesthetics, and precisely in this diversity are exemplary for the independent scene." The advisory board consists of the artistic direction and dramaturgy of Impulse, regional scouts, and an audience scout from the respective showcase partner. Thus, since 2018, the Impulse Theater Festival is once again a juried festival.

== Competition from 1990 to 2011 ==
Until 2011, an independent jury, together with the artistic director, selected the festival's participant productions. In addition, a prize jury reviewed the works shown during the festival and awarded various prizes. In 2011, in honour of the festival founder of the Dietmar N. Schmidt Prize was awarded for the best artistic performance of 1500 euros.
