= Blutenburg-Theater =

Coordinates: 48°08′58″N 11°32′31″E

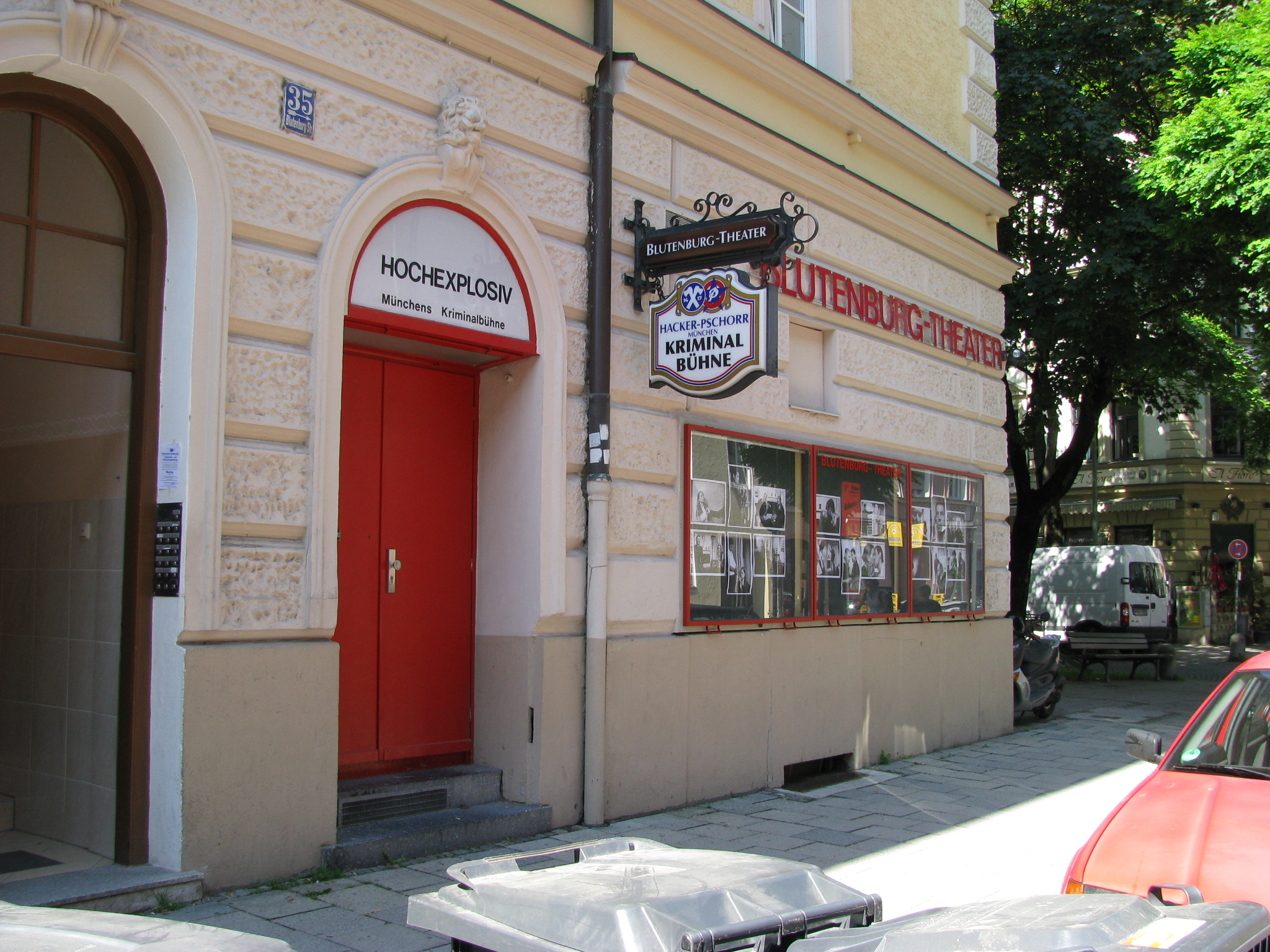
Blutenburg Theater

Blutenburg-Theater is a theatre in Munich, Bavaria, Germany that has existed since October 1983 which exclusively performs crime plays and crime comedies.

The Blutenburg Theater was the first crime theater in Germany and, alongside the Imperial Theater in Hamburg and the Berlin Kriminaltheater, is one of the few theaters in Germany that can be described as a crime theatre. The theater wants to offer "sophisticated entertainment theatre". In 2001, the newspaper Die Welt rated it as the leader in its genre in Germany.

The theater manager/artistic director was formerly René Siegel-Sorell and as of 2023 is Anne-Beate Engelke. The theater does not receive any subsidy from public funds. In the 2015/2016 theater season, 18,424 spectators were counted.

The theater seats 95 spectators and has a small theater bar. Three crime plays are performed each year.

== Ensemble ==
The Blutenburg Theater employs 10 people, including the assistant director, two evening directors and a technician. The theater has a large base of freelance actors.

=== Directors ===
Directors at the Blutenburg-Theater included:

- Frank Piotraschke
- Yvonne Brosch
- Miriam Gniwotta
- Hardy Hoosman
- Uwe Kosubek
- Konrad Adams
- Kai Taschner
