= Theater Viel Lärm um Nichts =

Theatre in Germany

Theater Viel Lärm um Nichts is a theatre in Munich, Bavaria, Germany.

See also Theater Viel Lärm um Nichts as a part of Pasinger Fabrik.
