= TamS =

Theatre in Munich, Germany

Coordinates: 48°09′44″N 11°35′26″E

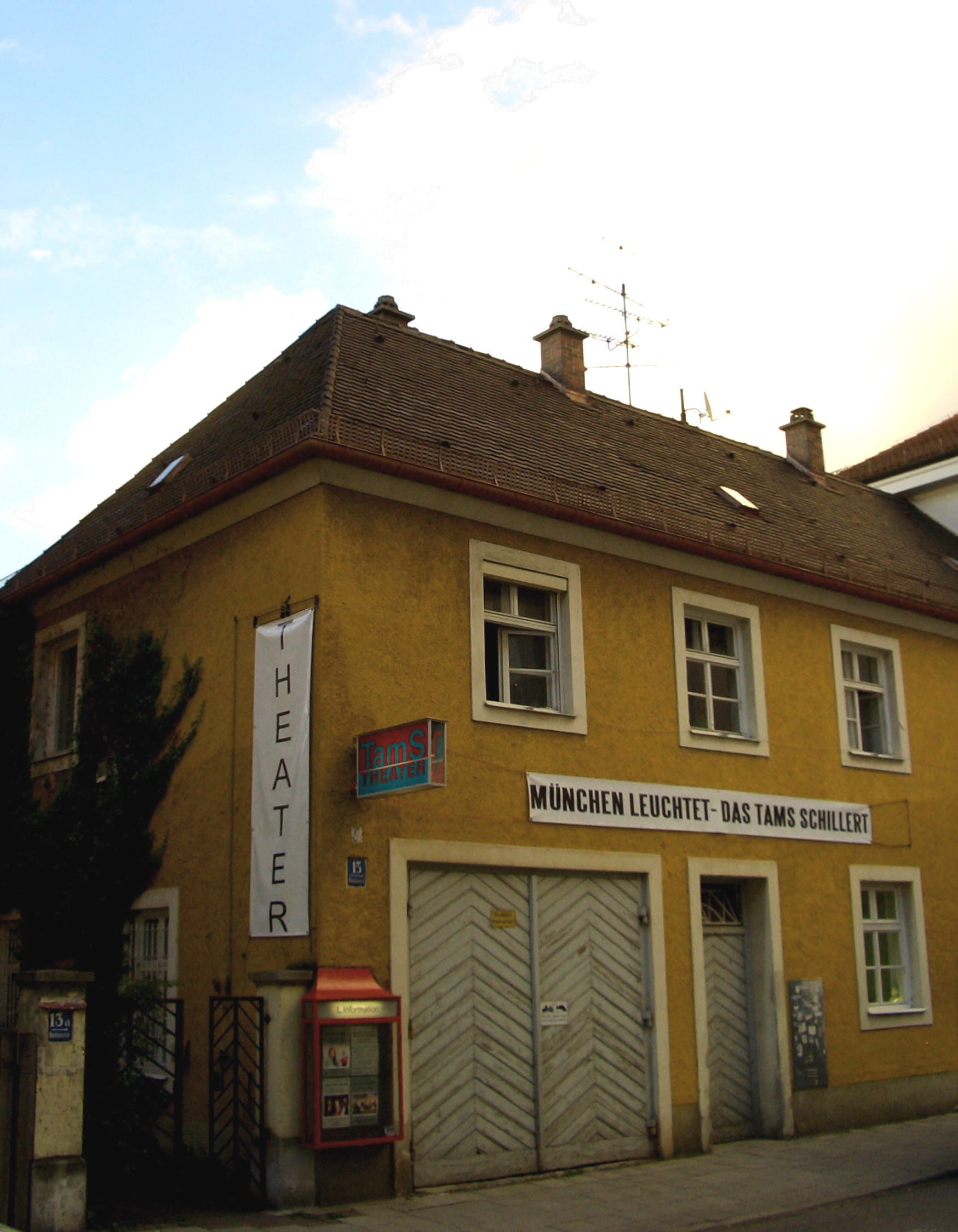
TamS

TamS is a theatre in Munich, Bavaria, Germany.
