= Rationaltheater =

German theater

Coordinates: 48°09′46″N 11°35′21″E

Rationaltheater is a theater in Munich, Bavaria, Germany.
