= Burgfriedensäule =

Boundary stones in Germany

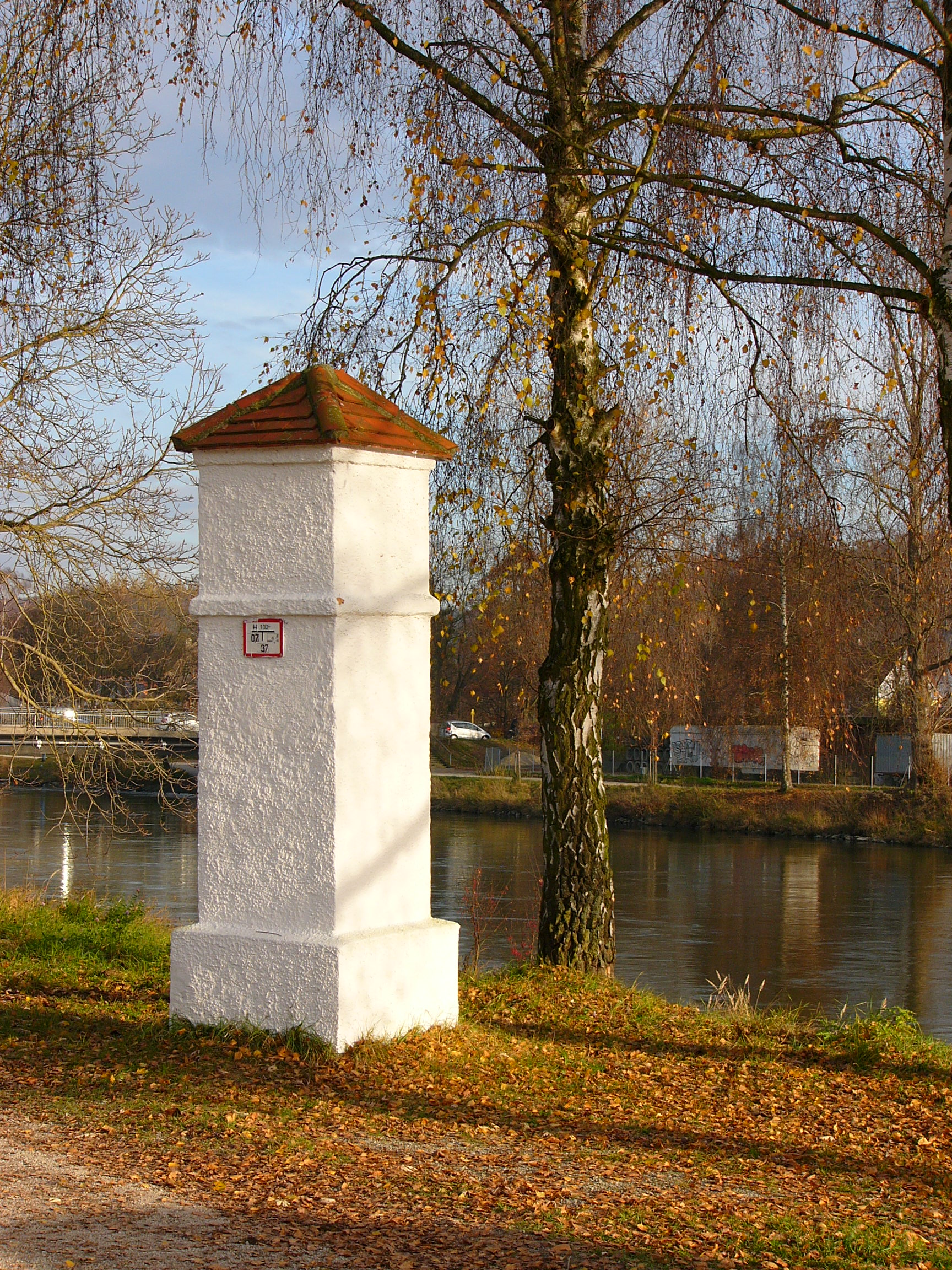
Burgfriedensäule in Landshut, Germany

In Germany, Burgfriedensäulen ("town freedom columns") are former boundary signs that were erected as boundary stones at certain points in the terrain around a city or castle. The spatial scope of a castle trench was determined by the stones.

Only a few of these small monuments still exist. In the area of the city of Landshut, 26 out of 43 identified locations have been preserved. Many historical debates with Bavaria are known about the pillars of the city of Regensburg. Out of the five pillars preserved in Munich, only the ones at the English Garden and at the Theresienwiese are on their original sites.
