= Theater Blaue Maus =

Theatre in Munich, Bavaria, Germany

Coordinates: 48°08′55″N 11°32′33″E

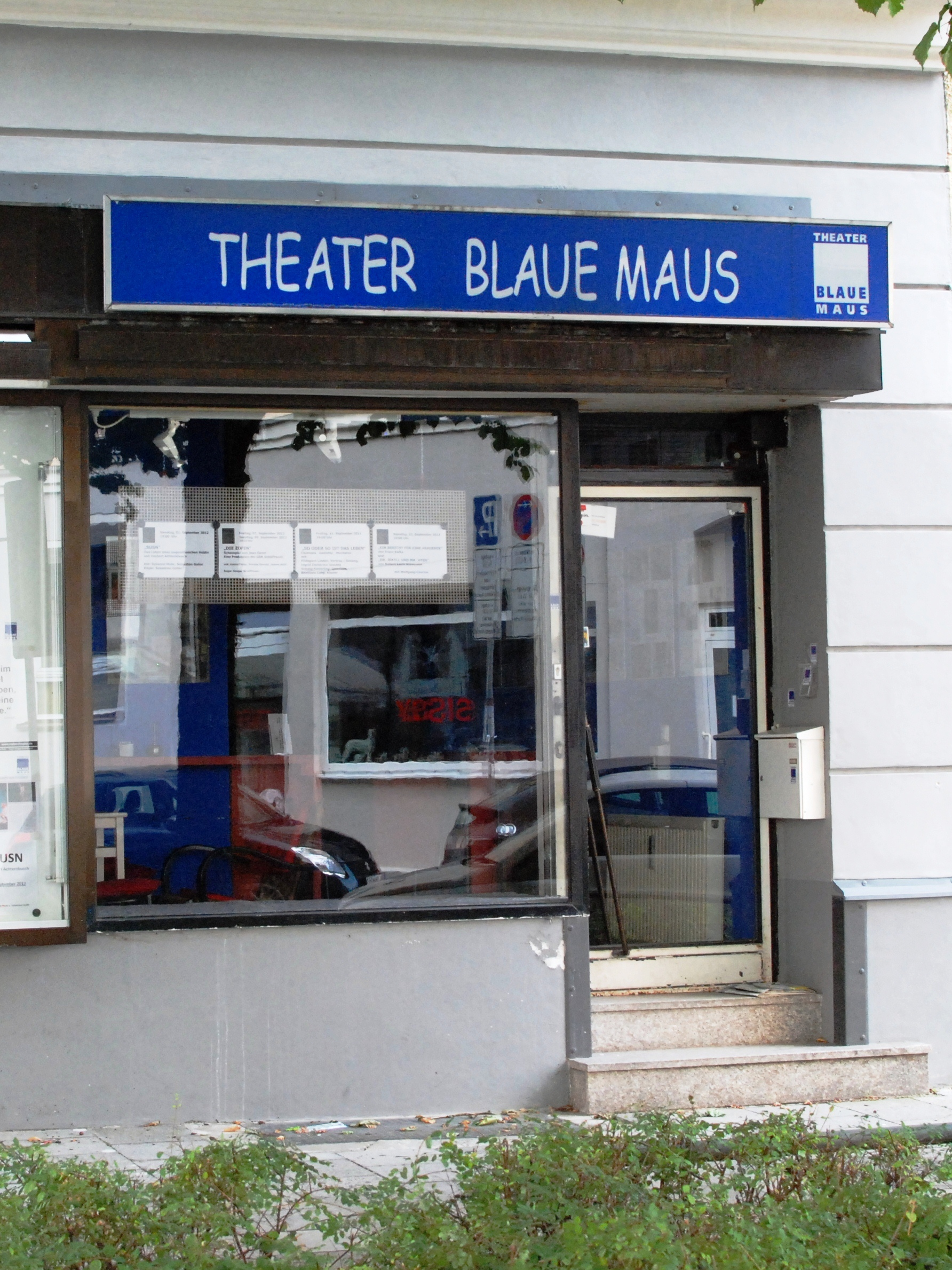
Theater Blaue Maus

Theater Blaue Maus is a theatre in Munich, Bavaria, Germany.
