= Theater44 =

Theatre in Munich, Germany

Coordinates: 48°09′36″N 11°34′56″E

Theater44 was a theatre in Munich, Bavaria, Germany. It opened in 1998 and was closed in May 2009.
