= FMG =

FMG may refer to:

== Schools ==
- Father Michael Goetz Secondary School, in Mississauga, Ontario, Canada

== Companies ==
- Flughafen München GmbH, operator of Munich Airport
- Fortescue, formerly Fortescue Metals Group, an Australian mining company
- FMG Insurance, a mutual insurance company in New Zealand
- Forum Media Group, a German publisher
- Fushun Mining Group, a Chinese mining and shale oil extraction company

== Politics and organisations ==
- Federación de Mocedades Galeguistas, the Galicianist Youth Federation, a defunct Galician nationalist group in Spain
- Film Music Guild, an American student organization

== Places ==
- Flemington railway station, in Sydney, Australia
- Fort Morgan station, in Colorado, United States
- Mainz-Gustavsburg station, in Germany

== Other ==
- Female muscle growth
- Ferromagnetic generator
- Foldable machine gun
- Foreign medical graduate
- Freddie M. Garcia (born 1944), Filipino businessman
