= Munich Airport =

International airport serving Munich, Germany

Munich Airport Flughafen München

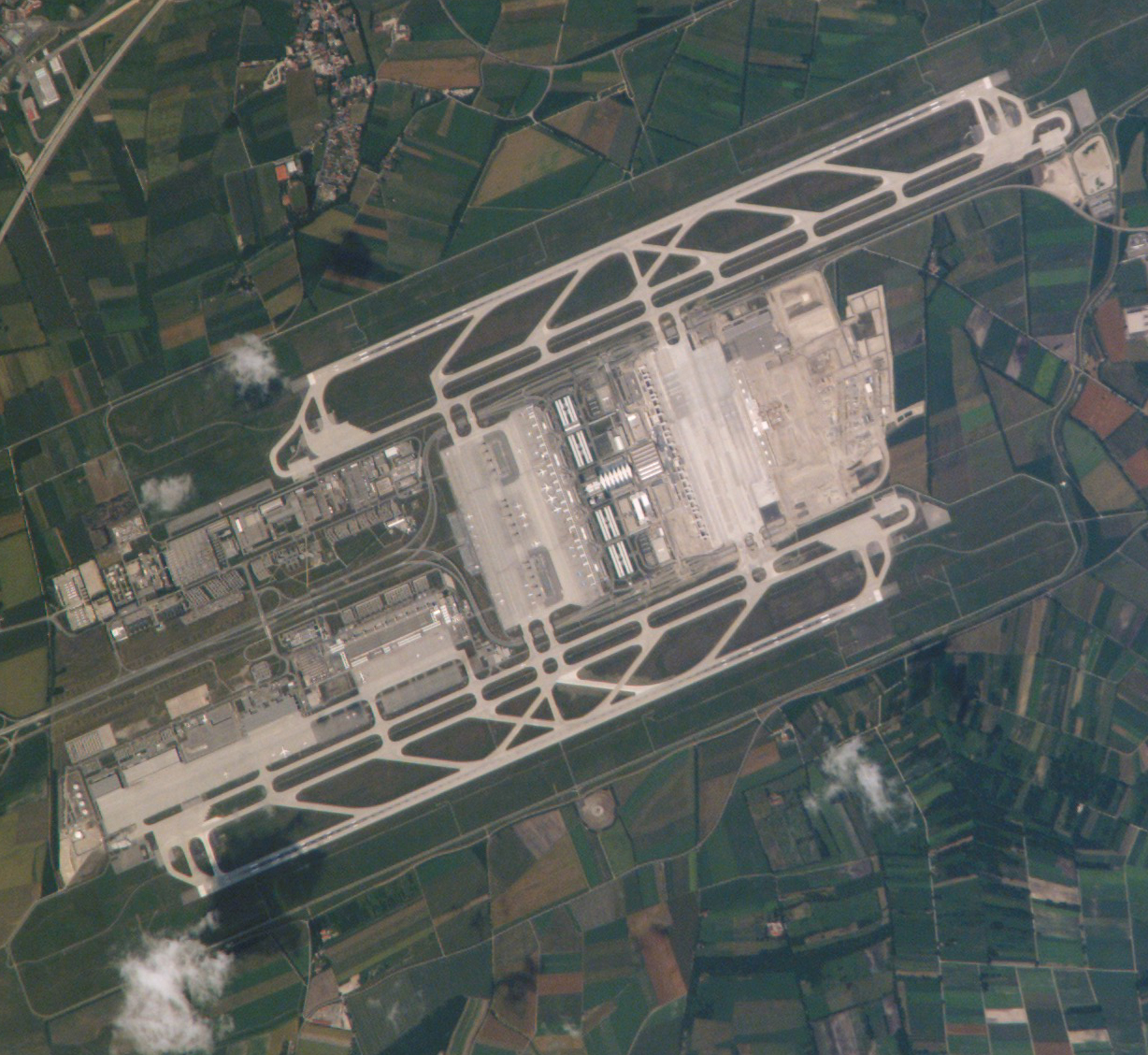
- Satellite view of the airport
- IATA: MUC; ICAO: EDDM; WMO: 10870

Summary
- Airport type: Public
- Owner: Flughafen München GmbH
- Operator: Flughafen München GmbH
- Serves: Munich Metropolitan Region, Upper Bavaria, parts of Austria
- Location: Erding and Freising, Bavaria, Germany
- Opened: 17 May 1992; 34 years ago
- Hub for: Lufthansa; Lufthansa CityLine; Lufthansa City Airlines
- Operating base for: Air Dolomiti; Condor; Discover Airlines; Eurowings; TUI fly Deutschland
- Elevation AMSL: 453 m (1,486 ft)
- Coordinates: 48°21′14″N 011°47′10″E
- Website: www.munich-airport.de

Map
- Location within Bavaria MUC/EDDM (Germany) MUC/EDDM (Europe)

Runways
Direction	Length		Surface
Direction	m	ft	Surface
08R/26L	4,000	13,123	Concrete
08L/26R	4,000	13,123	Concrete

Helipads
Number	Length		Surface
Number	m	ft	Surface
H	30	98	Concrete

Statistics (2025)
- Passengers: 43,394,442 ▲4.4%
- Aircraft movements: 337,438 ▲3.1%
- Cargo (metric tons): 339,671 ▲10.4%
- Sources: Munich Airport, ADV statistics, AIP at DFS

Munich Airport (German: Flughafen München “Franz Josef Strauß“; IATA: MUC, ICAO: EDDM) is an international airport serving Munich and the surrounding region of Upper Bavaria and Lower Bavaria. Located 28.5 km (17.7 mi) northeast of Munich near the town of Freising, it is named after former Bavarian minister-president Franz Josef Strauss. According to the German Aeronautical Information Publication, the airport's official English name is Muenchen Airport.

The airport is the second-busiest in Germany after Frankfurt Airport and the eleventh-busiest in Europe, handling 41.6 million passengers in 2024. It ranked as the 39th-busiest airport worldwide that year.

Munich Airport is a hub for Lufthansa. It has two passenger terminals, two runways, and extensive cargo and maintenance facilities capable of handling wide-body aircraft such as the Airbus A380.

== History ==
=== Foundation ===
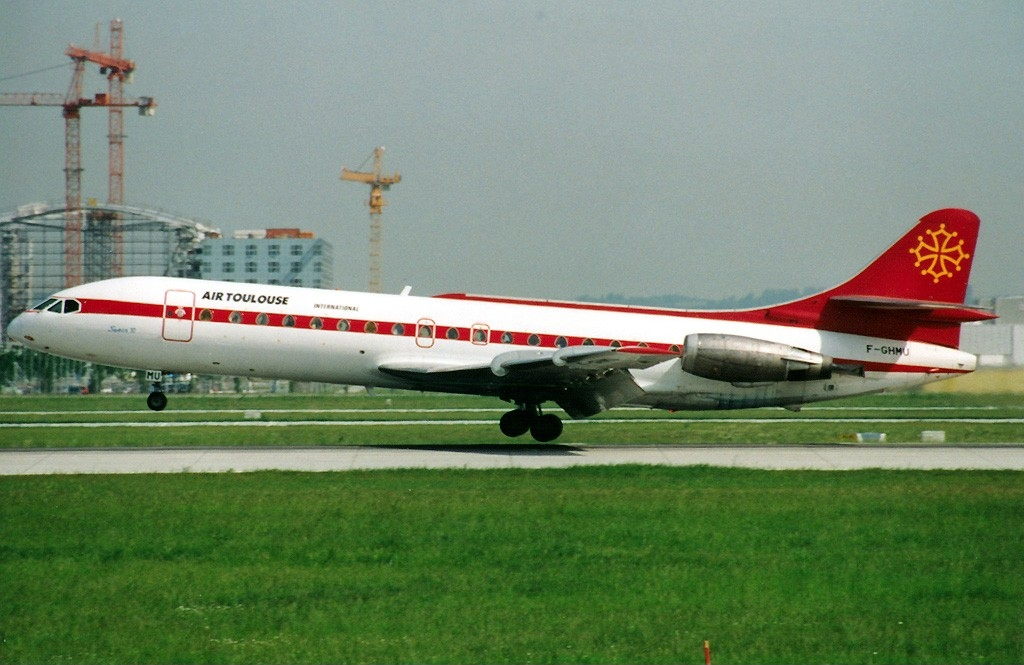
An Air Toulouse Sud Aviation Caravelle at Munich Airport in 1993. The construction site of today’s Hilton Munich Airport is visible in the background.

Munich Airport was named after Franz Josef Strauss, Minister-President of Bavaria from 1978 until 1988, who had supported the project and promoted Bavaria as an aviation hub. Strauss, a private pilot, also served as the first chairman of the Airbus supervisory board.

The airport opened on 17 May 1992. Munich-Riem Airport, the city's previous airport, closed on 16 May 1992, and the IATA airport code MUC and the ICAO airport code EDDM were reassigned from Munich-Riem Airport to the new Munich Airport.

=== Operations ===
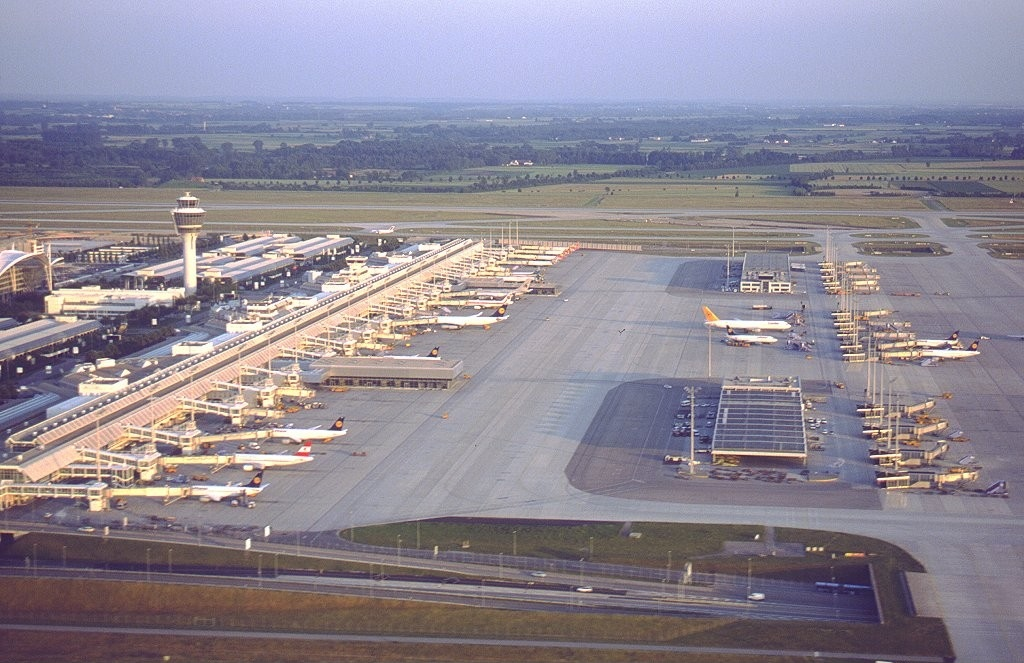
Terminal 1 in 2001, before Terminal 2 opened

Passenger traffic more than doubled between 1995 and 2006, from under 15 million to over 30 million annually, despite the impact of the September 11 attacks.

To accommodate growth, Terminal 2 opened in June 2003 as a dedicated facility for Lufthansa and its Star Alliance partners. In 2015, more than 40 million passengers passed through Munich Airport for the first time. In 2018 the airport recorded 46.2 million passengers and 413,000 aircraft movements, serving 266 destinations.

In 2015 Condor announced a new long-haul base at Munich, followed later that year by Transavia opening a base with four aircraft; Transavia closed the operation in 2017. In 2016 Eurowings established a base with routes operated by Air Berlin under a wet-lease agreement. In 2021, Lufthansa announced it would take over most of Eurowings’ Munich services.

=== Corporate identity ===
In November 2013 the airport introduced a new corporate design. The stylized "M" remained but adopted a different typeface and a colored dash, with animated versions installed at prominent locations such as the Terminal 2 satellite.

== Terminals and facilities ==
Munich Airport covers 1,575 hectares (3,892 acres) of land. Most facilities are located in the central area between the two parallel runways. The western zone contains cargo and maintenance facilities, administrative buildings, parking areas, and the Visitors’ Centre. Moving east are the west apron, Terminal 1, the Munich Airport Center (MAC), Terminal 2, and the east apron. The airport has two passenger terminals, each designed to handle tens of millions of passengers annually.

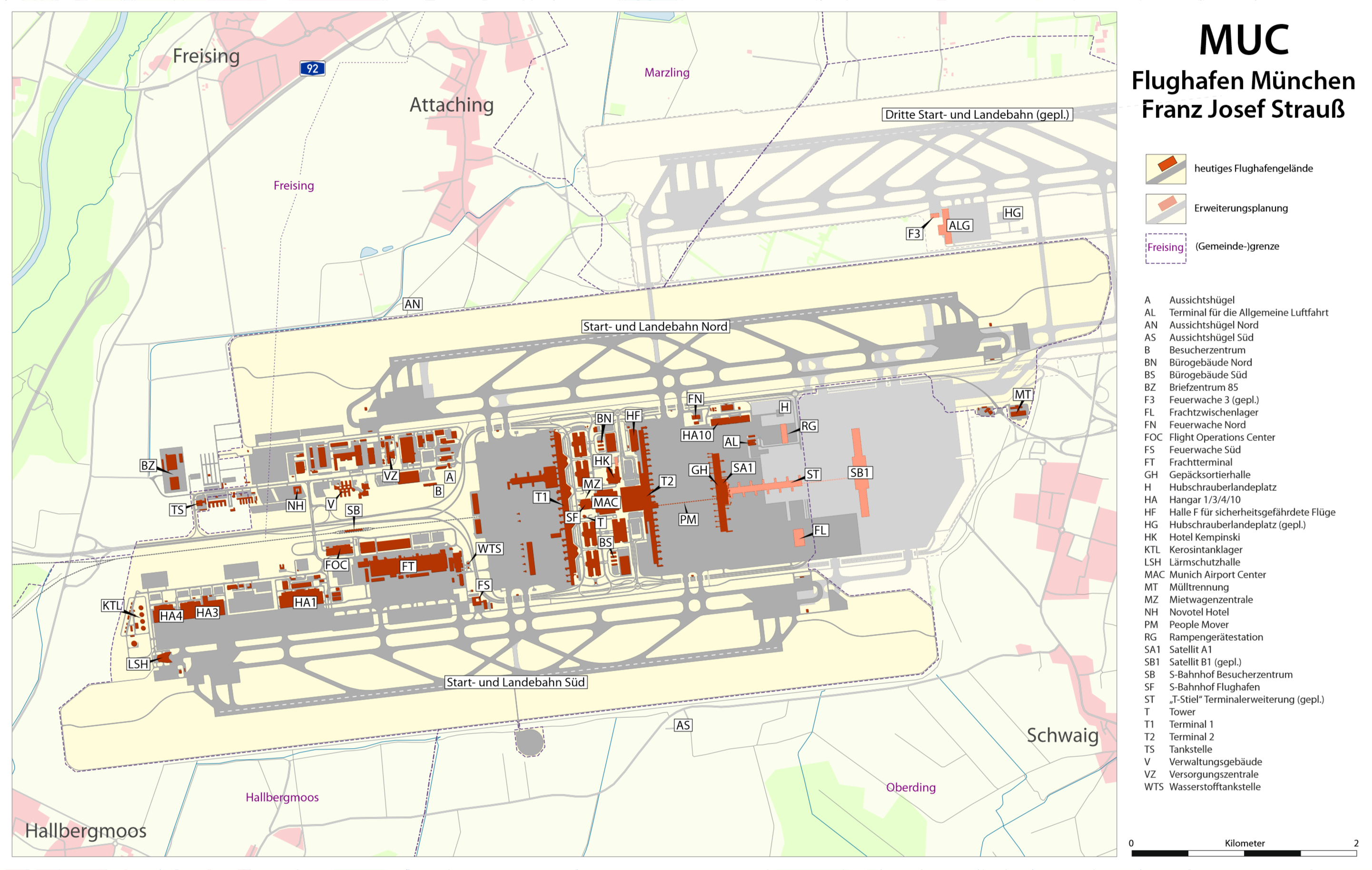
Map of Munich Airport (including planned expansion)

=== Terminal 1 ===
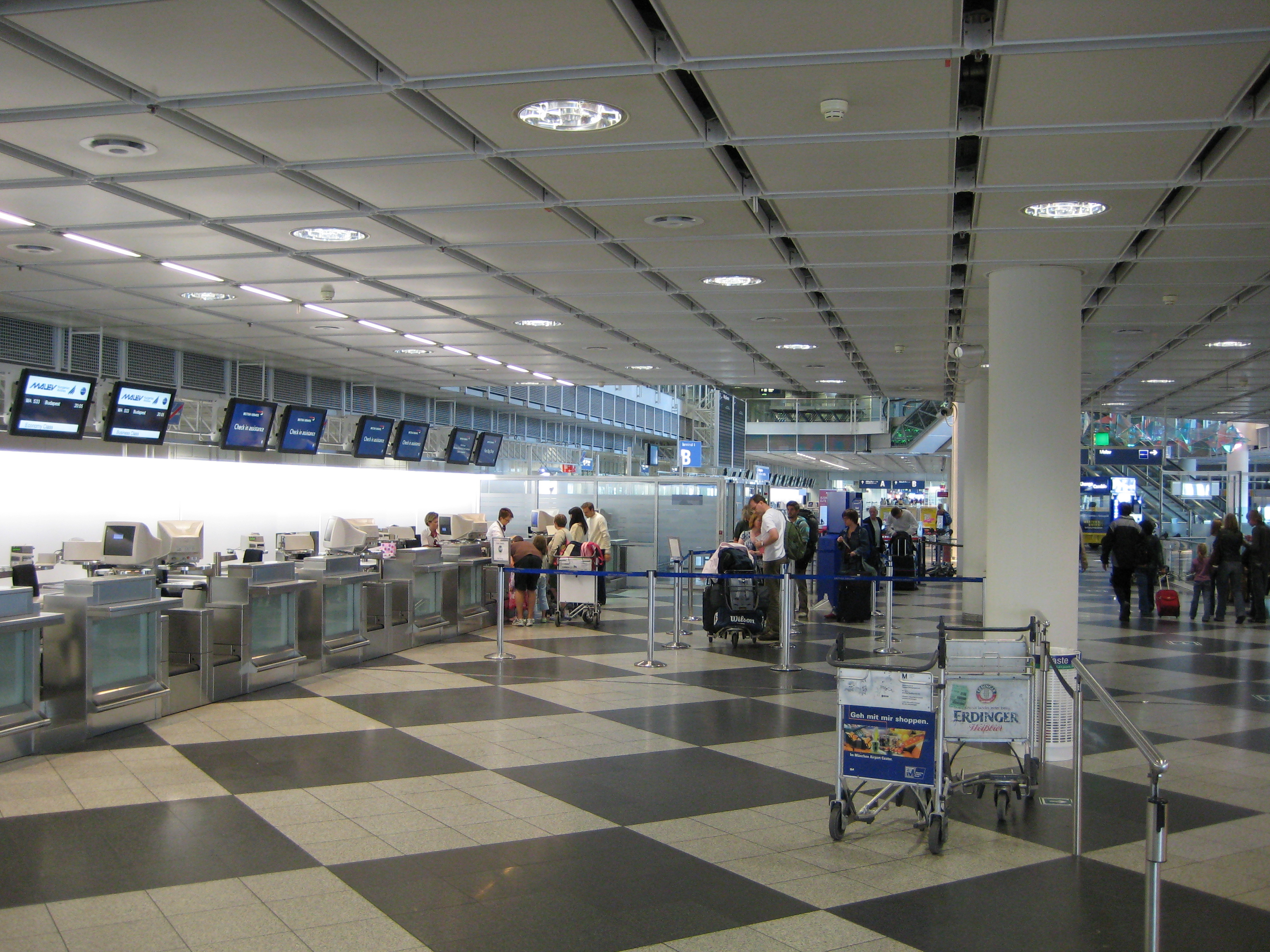
Check-in area at Terminal 1B

Terminal 1 is the older of the two passenger terminals and began operation when the airport opened on 17 May 1992. It is subdivided into five modules (A–E). Modules A–D provide facilities for both departures and arrivals, while module E handles arrivals only, making each module a largely self-contained unit. Modules A and D are used for flights within the Schengen Area, while modules B and C handle non-Schengen destinations. A separate facility, Hall F, is located near Terminal 2 and serves flights requiring additional security measures, such as those to Israel. Some check-in counters for Terminal 1 flights are also located in the central area Z (German: Zentralbereich), which houses much of the terminal’s shopping, dining, and the airport’s suburban railway station.

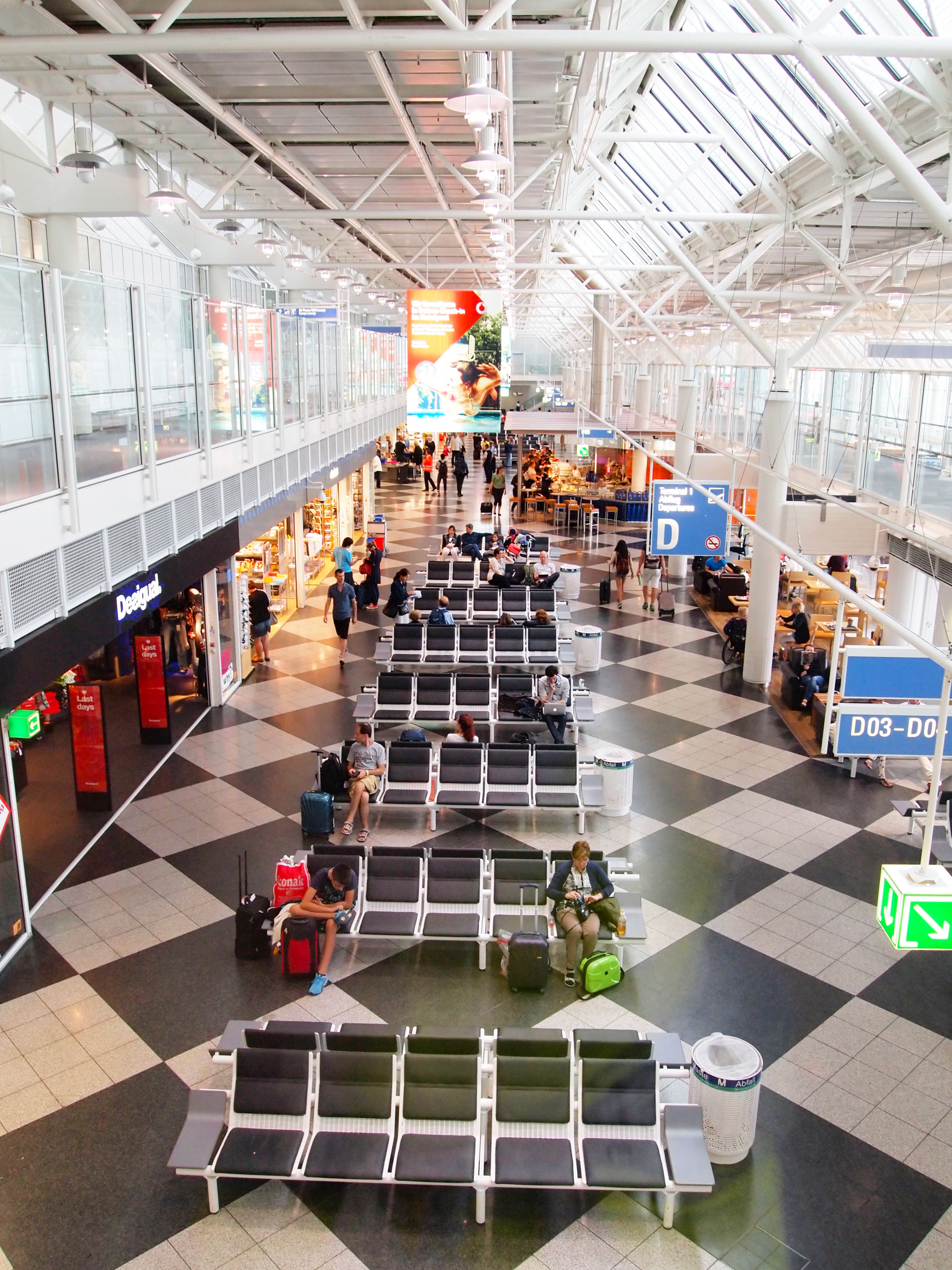
Boarding gate area at Terminal 1D

The terminal’s pier is 1,081-metre (3,547-foot) long and has 21 jet bridges, including one gate equipped with three jet bridges for the Airbus A380, used by Emirates. There are also around 60 apron stands, some with specially designed bridges that allow boarding via bus transfer.

Terminal 1 today mainly accommodates airlines that are not members or partners of the Star Alliance. Major users include American Airlines, Cathay Pacific, Condor, Delta Air Lines, easyJet, Eurowings, Emirates, Etihad Airways, Qatar Airways, and TUI fly Deutschland.

=== Terminal 2 ===
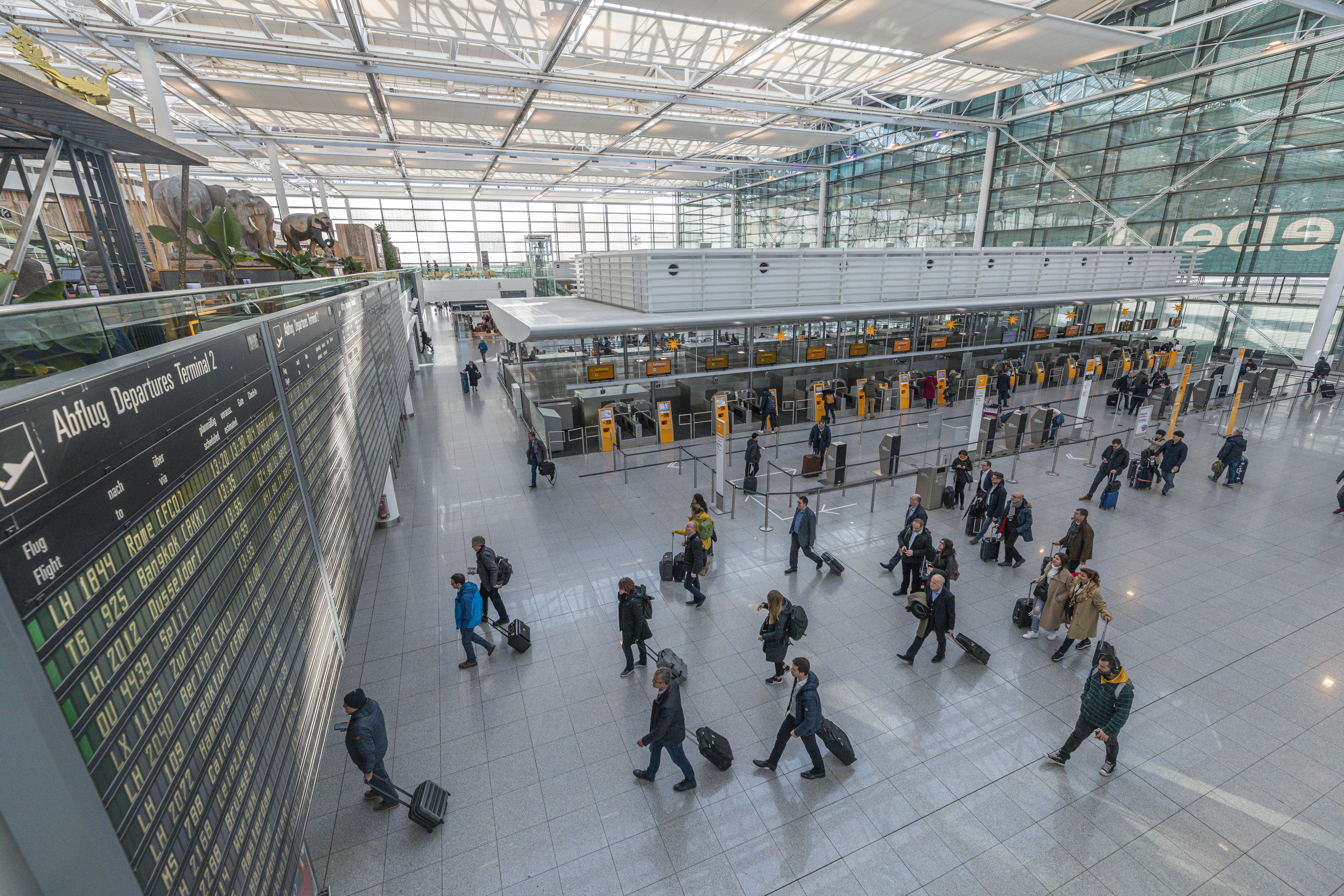
Check-in hall, Terminal 2

Terminal 2 opened on 29 June 2003 with an initial capacity of about 25 million passengers per year. In January 2009 an additional transfer level was introduced in response to new European Union security requirements, allowing separation of passenger flows.

The terminal is primarily used by Lufthansa and its Star Alliance partners. Luxair also operates from the building.

Terminal 2 is arranged around a central plaza rather than modules, as in Terminal 1. It has two main departure levels: Level 4 (G) for Schengen flights and Level 5 (H) for non-Schengen flights, plus bus gates on Level 3. The main pier is about 980 m (3,220 ft) long and includes 24 jet bridges, with more than 70 aircraft stands on the east apron. Additional west apron stands are sometimes used, with passengers transferred by bus. The terminal is equipped to handle large aircraft such as the Airbus A380, particularly after the opening of the Terminal 2 Satellite building.

The facility is operated by Terminal-2-Betriebsgesellschaft (Terminal 2 Operating Company), a joint venture between Flughafen München GmbH (60%) and Lufthansa (40%), making it the first German terminal co-operated by an airline.

==== Terminal 2 Satellite ====
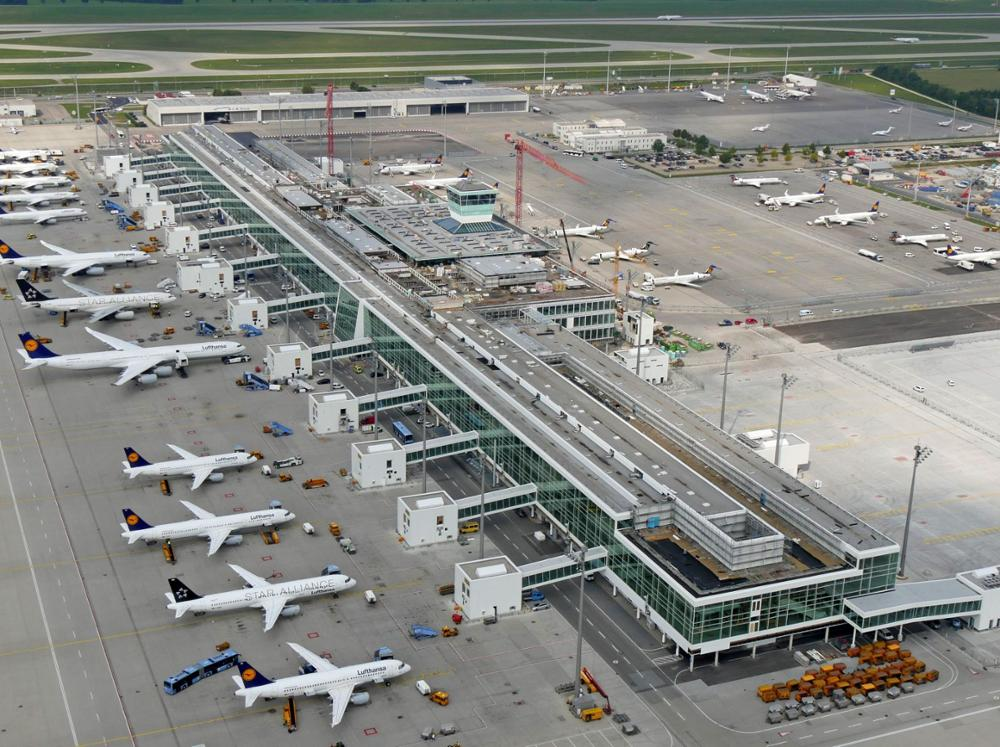
Terminal 2 Satellite under construction, February 2016

Terminal 2 was projected to reach full capacity of about 27.5 million passengers per year by 2013. Plans for an expansion were developed in cooperation with Lufthansa and its Star Alliance partners. The satellite design allowed for additional capacity while retaining shared facilities such as check-in and baggage claim in Terminal 2 to simplify transfers within the Lufthansa and Star Alliance network. Preparations for the project began soon after Terminal 2 opened in 2003.

The €650 million project was funded 60% by Munich Airport and 40% by Lufthansa. Construction was approved in 2010 and began in 2012. The building was completed in late 2015, followed by trial operations in January 2016. It was inaugurated on 22 April 2016 and opened for passengers on 26 April 2016.

The satellite building is 609 m long and has 125,000 m² of floor space. It provides 52 additional gates and 27 aircraft stands, 11 of which can accommodate wide-body aircraft including the Airbus A380. Facilities are divided by function: Level K for Schengen flights, Level L for non-Schengen, and a J area for apron bus boarding. The terminal includes 44 passport control stations, 24 security lanes for transfer passengers, five Lufthansa lounges, and additional restaurants and shops. As an airside-only facility, all check-in, baggage claim and public arrivals functions remain in Terminal 2. A fully automated underground people mover system by Bombardier Transportation connects Terminal 2 and the satellite. The terminal handled its one millionth passenger in July 2016, less than three months after opening.

Plans for further expansion include extending the satellite building into a T-shaped layout and a possible third terminal to the east. In March 2026 Lufthansa and Flughafen München GmbH announced satellite building will be expanded with a pier connecting at a right angle to the east. The expansion is scheduled to open in 2035 and will increase the terminal's annual capacity by up to 10 million passengers.

=== Munich Airport Center ===
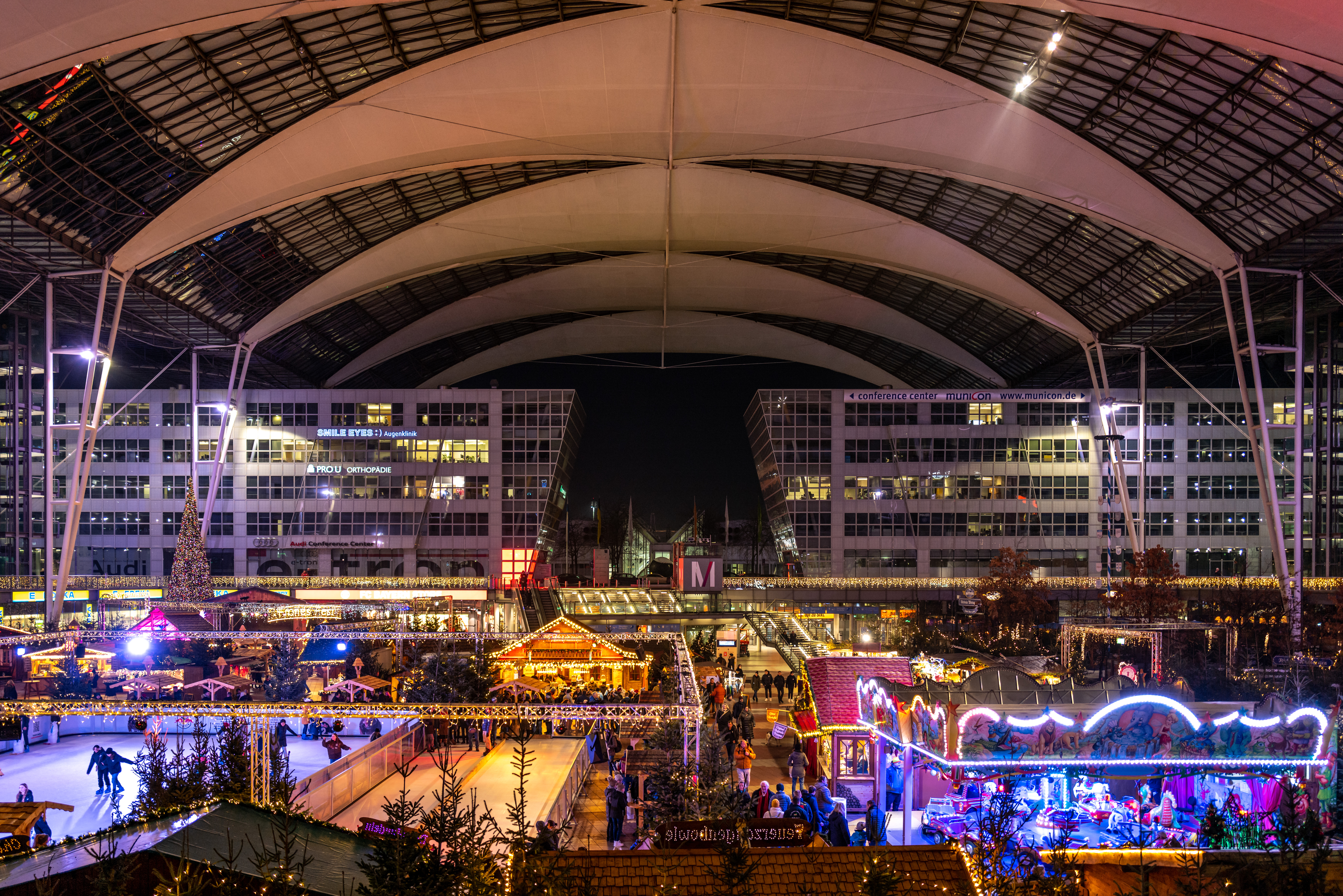
Munich Airport Center (MAC) during the annual Christmas market

The Munich Airport Center (MAC) is a shopping, business and recreation complex that links the terminals. The older Central Area (Zentralbereich), originally built as part of Terminal 1, contains a shopping mall and the Munich S-Bahn station. The newer MAC Forum, completed with Terminal 2, is a covered outdoor area with a large transparent roof.

Adjacent to the forum is the airport hotel, operated by Hilton Hotels & Resorts, designed by architect Helmut Jahn with landscape architecture by PWP Landscape Architecture. It opened in 1994.

The MAC also houses a supermarket that is permitted to trade daily from 05:30 until midnight, including Sundays, as an exemption to Bavarian retail hour restrictions (Ladenschlussgesetz).

=== Runways ===
The airport has two parallel concrete runways, 08R/26L and 08L/26R, each 4,000 m (13,000 ft) long and 60 m (200 ft) wide, as well as one helipad.

Plans for a third runway have been proposed but remain subject to political and legal debate.

=== Parking areas ===
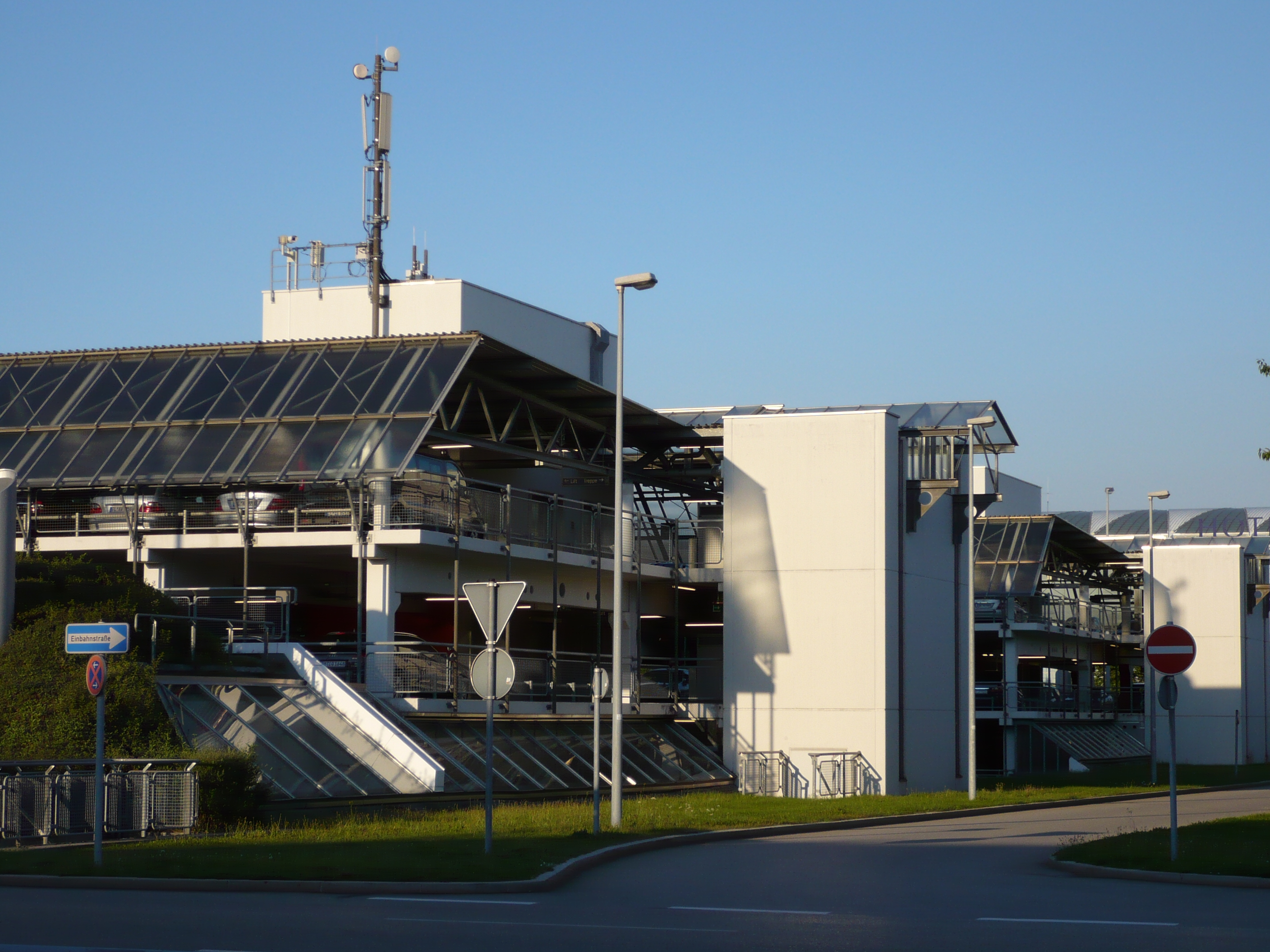
Parking garage in front of Terminal 1

Munich Airport provides five parking garages and six underground car parks with a total capacity of around 30,000 spaces, of which about 16,500 are covered. The largest facility, garage P20 at Terminal 2, opened in 2003 with 6,400 spaces on eleven levels (four underground) and was the largest in Germany until surpassed by the car park at Allianz Arena in 2005.

A parking guidance system directs drivers to available spaces. Additional premium options are offered, including valet parking, hotel-and-parking packages, oversized spaces, and secure parking areas. Short-term spaces are available east of the central area, with 30 minutes of free parking, and seasonal discounted rates are provided in the P8 garage.

=== Observation facilities ===
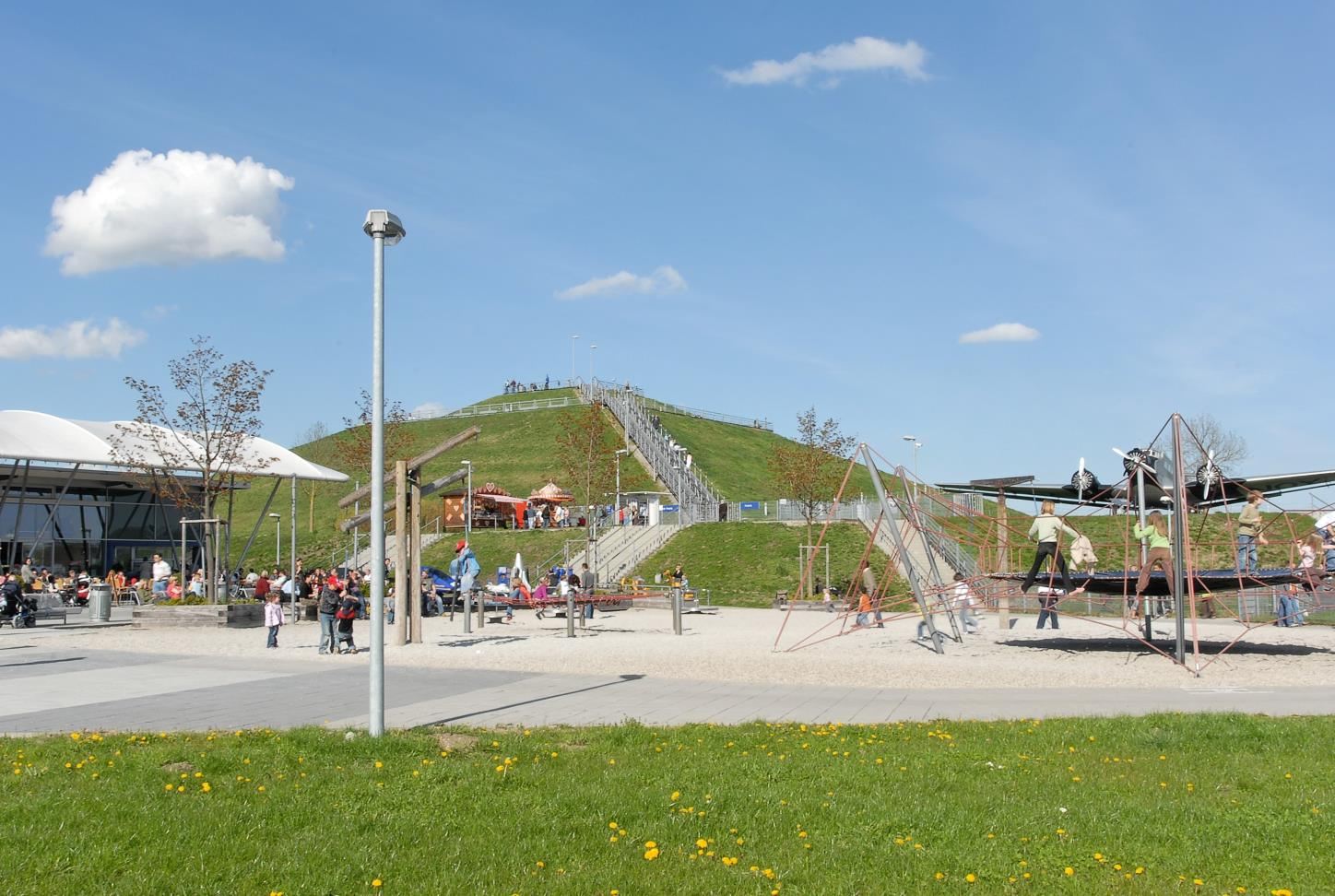
Visitors Park at Munich Airport

Munich Airport operates a Visitors Park that includes a viewing hill overlooking the western apron and Terminal 1, together with a restaurant, gift shop and playground. Three historic aircraft are displayed in the park: a Lockheed Super Constellation, a Douglas DC-3 and a Junkers Ju 52. The site is served by Munich Airport Besucherpark station.

A second viewing facility is located on the roof of Terminal 2. This free observation deck features a wide glassed balcony with seating areas, offering views of the eastern apron and the Terminal 2 Satellite building. The terrace is accessible from the public (landside) area of the terminal.

== Airlines and destinations ==
=== Passenger ===
The following airlines offer regular scheduled and charter flights at Munich Airport:

Airlines	Destinations
Aegean Airlines	Athens, Heraklion, Rhodes, Thessaloniki; Seasonal: Kalamata
Aer Lingus	Dublin; Seasonal: Cork
Air Anka	Seasonal charter: Antalya
Air Arabia	Sharjah
airBaltic	Riga, Tallinn, Vilnius
Air Cairo	Hurghada, Marsa Alam
Air Canada	Toronto–Pearson
Air China	Beijing–Capital, Shanghai–Pudong
Air Corsica	Seasonal: Ajaccio, Calvi
Air Dolomiti	Amsterdam, Bari, Basel, Bologna, Florence, Geneva, Graz, Krakow, Milan–Malpensa, Turin, Venice Verona, Zagreb, Zurich; Seasonal: Ancona, Brindisi, Genoa, Jersey Luxembourg,
Air Europa	Madrid
Air France	Paris–Charles de Gaulle
Air Serbia	Belgrade
AJet	Istanbul–Sabiha Gökçen; Seasonal: Adana/Mersin (begins 28 April 2027), Dalaman (begins 25 April 2027), Samsun (begins 25 April 2027), Trabzon (begins 16 June 2027)
American Airlines	Charlotte
All Nippon Airways	Tokyo–Haneda
arkia	Tel Aviv
Austrian Airlines	Vienna
BeOnd	Seasonal: Dubai–Al Maktoum, Malé, Red Sea (begins 16 December 2026)
Bluebird Airways	Tel Aviv
British Airways	London–Heathrow
Brussels Airlines	Brussels
Cathay Pacific	Hong Kong
Condor	Frankfurt, Funchal, Fuerteventura, Heraklion, Hurghada, Lanzarote, La Palma, Las Palmas, Palma de Mallorca, Tenerife–South; Seasonal: Agadir, Chania, Corfu, Faro, Ibiza, Kavala, Kefalonia, Kos, Lamezia Terme, Olbia, Preveza/Lefkada, Rhodes, Skiathos Zakynthos; Charter: Arvidsjaur
Corendon Airlines	Seasonal: Antalya
Croatia Airlines	Osijek, Zagreb; Seasonal: Dubrovnik, Rijeka, Split, Zadar
Cyprus Airways	Larnaca (resumes 17 December 2026)
Delta Air Lines	Atlanta; Seasonal: Detroit
Discover Airlines	Funchal, Gran Canaria, Heraklion, Ibiza, Larnaca, Marrakesh, Orlando, Palma de Mallorca, Reykjavík, Seattle/Tacoma (begins 7 April 2027), Tenerife-South, Windhoek Seasonal: Alghero (begins 4 June 2027), Bodø, Burgas, Calgary, Chania, Corfu, Djerba, Fuerteventura, Glasgow (begins 16 May 2027), Harstad/Narvik, Hurghada, Ivalo (begins 23 December 2026), Jerez de la Frontera, Kalamata, Kefalonia, Kos, La Palma, Lanzarote, Mykonos, Menorca, Monastir, Punta Cana, Rhodes, Samos, Santorini, Skiathos, Varna Zakynthos
easyJet	Bristol, Edinburgh, London–Gatwick, Manchester, Milan–Malpensa, Naples, Rome–Fiumicino; Seasonal: London–Luton, London–Southend
Egyptair	Cairo
El Al	Tel Aviv
Emirates	Dubai–International
Etihad Airways	Abu Dhabi
Eurowings	Cologne/Bonn, Düsseldorf, Hamburg, Palma de Mallorca, Pristina
EVA Air	Taipei–Taoyuan
Finnair	Helsinki
Fly2Galicia operated by Flyyo	Santiago de Compostela (begins 3 December 2026)
Flynas	Seasonal: Riyadh
Freebird Airlines	Seasonal: Antalya; Seasonal charter: Skopje
GP Aviation	Charter: Pristina
Gulf Air	Bahrain
Iberia	Madrid
Icelandair	Reykjavik
ITA Airways	Milan–Linate, Rome–Fiumicino
KLM	Amsterdam
KM Malta Airlines	Malta
Kuwait Airways	Kuwait City
LEAV Aviation	Seasonal: Arvidsjaur
LOT Polish Airlines	Warsaw–Chopin
Lufthansa	Amsterdam, Athens, Bangkok, Barcelona, Basel, Bastia, Beijing–Capital, Belgrade, Bengaluru, Berlin, Bilbao, Bordeaux, Boston, Bremen, Brussels, Budapest, Cairo, Cape Town, Charlotte, Chicago–O'Hare, Cluj-Napoca, Cologne/Bonn, Copenhagen, Debrecen, Delhi–Indira Gandhi, Denver, Dresden, Dubai–International, Dublin, Dubrovnik, Düsseldorf, Faro, Frankfurt, Geneva, Gdańsk, Göteborg, Hamburg, Hanover, Helsinki, Heraklion, Istanbul, Johannesburg, Kraków, Lisbon, London–Heathrow, Los Angeles, Luxembourg, Madrid, Milan–Linate Marseille, Mexico City–Benito Juárez, Miami, Montréal–Trudeau, Mumbai, Nantes, New York–JFK, Newark, Nice, Olbia, Oradea, Osaka–Kansai, Oslo, Paris–Charles de Gaulle, Phoenix–Sky Harbor (begins 3 August 2027), Porto, Prague, Rhodes, Riyadh, Rome–Fiumicino, Rzeszów, San Diego, San Francisco, São Paulo–Guarulhos, Seattle/Tacoma, Seoul–Incheon, Shanghai–Pudong, Sibiu, Singapore, Sofia, Split, Stockholm, Stuttgart, Tbilisi, Tel Aviv, Toulouse, Trondheim Tunis, Vancouver, Washington–Dulles, Zagreb, Zurich; Seasonal: Bergen, Biarritz, Cagliari, Corfu, Jersey, Kittilä, Lamezia Terme, Ljubljana, London–Stansted, Lyon, Rovaniemi (begins 4 December 2026), Tromsø
Lufthansa City Airlines	Alicante, Amsterdam, Barcelona, Berlin, Basel, Birmingham, Bordeaux, Bremen, Bucharest, Catania, Cologne/Bonn, Dublin, Düsseldorf, Faro, Göteborg, Hannover, Helsinki, London–Heathrow, Málaga, Malta, Manchester, Münster/Osnabrück, Naples, Palma de Mallorca, Seville, Sofia, Timișoara, Valencia
Luxair	Luxembourg
Nesma Airlines	Seasonal charter: Hurghada
Nile Air	Seasonal: Hurghada
Norwegian Air Shuttle	Copenhagen, Oslo, Stockholm–Arlanda; Seasonal: Alicante, Málaga, Rovaniemi, Tromsø
Nouvelair	Tunis Seasonal: Monastir
Oman Air	Muscat
Pegasus Airlines	Istanbul–Sabiha Gökçen; Seasonal: Antalya
Qatar Airways	Doha
Royal Air Maroc	Casablanca
Royal Jordanian	Amman–Queen Alia
SAS	Copenhagen, Oslo
SCAT Airlines	Şymkent
Saudia	Jeddah,
Singapore Airlines	Singapore
Sky Express	Athens
Somon Air	Dushanbe
SunExpress	Ankara, Antalya; Seasonal: Adana/Mersin, Bodrum, Dalaman, Edremit, Gaziantep, Kayseri, Izmir
Swiss International Air Lines	Zürich
Syrian Airlines	Damascus
TAP Air Portugal	Lisbon
Thai Airways International	Bangkok–Suvarnabhumi
Tailwind Airlines	Seasonal charter: Antalya
Travelcoup	Seasonal: Ibiza, Palma de Mallorca, Zürich
TUI fly Deutschland	Boa Vista, Fuerteventura, Funchal, Gran Canaria, Hurghada, Lanzarote, Las Palmas, Sal, Tenerife–South; Seasonal: Corfu, Dalaman, Djerba Heraklion, Jerez de la Frontera, Kos, Marsa Alam, Menorca, Patras, Rhodes
Tunisair	Djerba, Monastir, Tunis
Turkish Airlines	Istanbul; Seasonal charter: Antalya
United Airlines	Chicago–O'Hare, Denver, Houston–Intercontinental, Newark, San Francisco, Washington–Dulles
UR Airlines	Erbil
Uzbekistan Airways	Tashkent
Vietnam Airlines	Hanoi, Ho Chi Minh City
Volotea	Strasbourg
Vueling	Barcelona

== Statistics ==
=== Annual traffic ===
Annual passenger traffic
Year	Passengers	% change
2000	23,125,872	Steady
2001	23,646,900	▲2.2%
2002	23,163,720	▼2.0%
2003	24,193,304	▲4.4%
2004	26,814,505	▲10.8%
2005	28,619,427	▲6.7%
2006	30,757,978	▲7.5%
2007	33,959,422	▲10.4%
2008	34,530,593	▲1.7%
2009	32,681,067	▼5.4%
2010	34,721,605	▲6.2%
2011	37,763,701	▲8.7%
2012	38,360,604	▲1.6%
2013	38,672,644	▲0.8%
2014	39,700,515	▲2.7%
2015	40,998,553	▲3.3%
2016	42,277,920	▲3.1%
2017	44,546,263	▲5.4%
2018	46,253,623	▲3.8%
2019	47,959,885	▲3.7%
2020	11,120,224	▼76.8%
2021	12,496,432	▲12.4%
2022	31,642,738	▲153.2%
2023	37,037,070	▲17.0%
2024	41,568,000	▲12.2%

Source: Munich Airport

=== Busiest routes ===
All figures below are for 2020, reflecting the impact of the COVID-19 pandemic.

Busiest domestic routes from Munich (2020)
Rank	Airport	Passengers	Main airlines
1	Hamburg	271,704	Eurowings, Lufthansa
2	Berlin–Tegel (closed 2020)	219,586	Lufthansa
3	Düsseldorf	215,028	Eurowings, Lufthansa
4	Frankfurt	170,653	Lufthansa
5	Cologne/Bonn	117,261	Eurowings, Lufthansa

Busiest European routes from Munich (2020)
Rank	Airport	Passengers	Main airlines
1	London–Heathrow	156,903	British Airways, Lufthansa
2	Amsterdam	129,741	Eurowings, KLM, Lufthansa, Transavia
3	Paris–Charles de Gaulle	119,506	Air France, Lufthansa
4	Madrid	102,736	Air Europa, Iberia, Lufthansa
5	Athens	97,928	Aegean Airlines, Lufthansa
6	Rome–Fiumicino	93,632	Alitalia, Lufthansa
7	Barcelona	88,487	Lufthansa, Vueling
8	Stockholm–Arlanda	76,405	Lufthansa, Norwegian, SAS
9	Copenhagen	72,981	Lufthansa, Norwegian, SAS
10	Lisbon	72,946	Lufthansa, TAP Air Portugal

Busiest intercontinental routes from Munich (2020)
Rank	Airport	Passengers	Main airlines
1	Dubai International	76,353	Emirates, Lufthansa
2	Doha	48,104	Qatar Airways
3	Bangkok–Suvarnabhumi	39,402	Lufthansa, Thai Airways
4	Abu Dhabi	37,895	Etihad Airways
5	Newark	37,813	Lufthansa, United Airlines

== Facilities ==
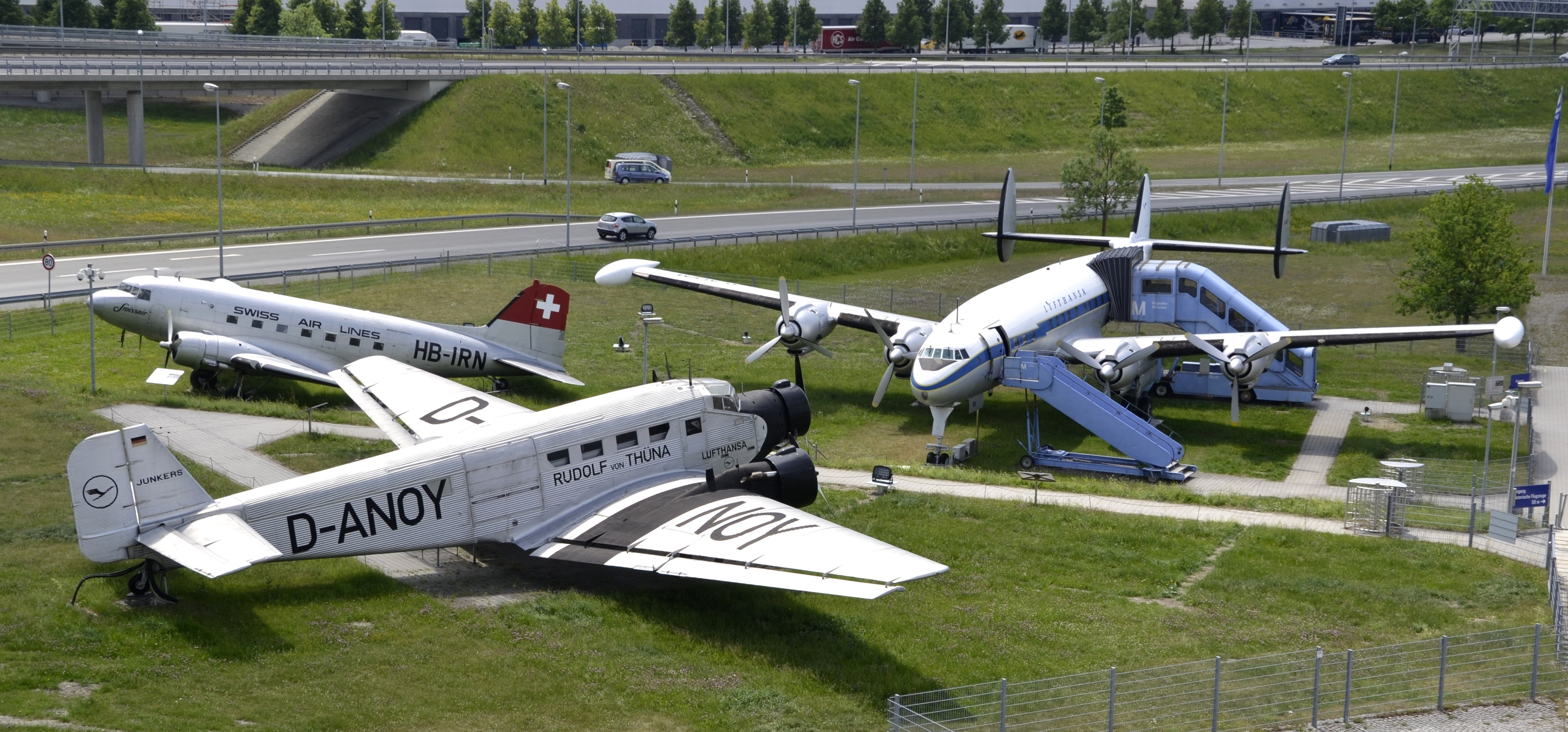
Historic aircraft at the Visitors Park

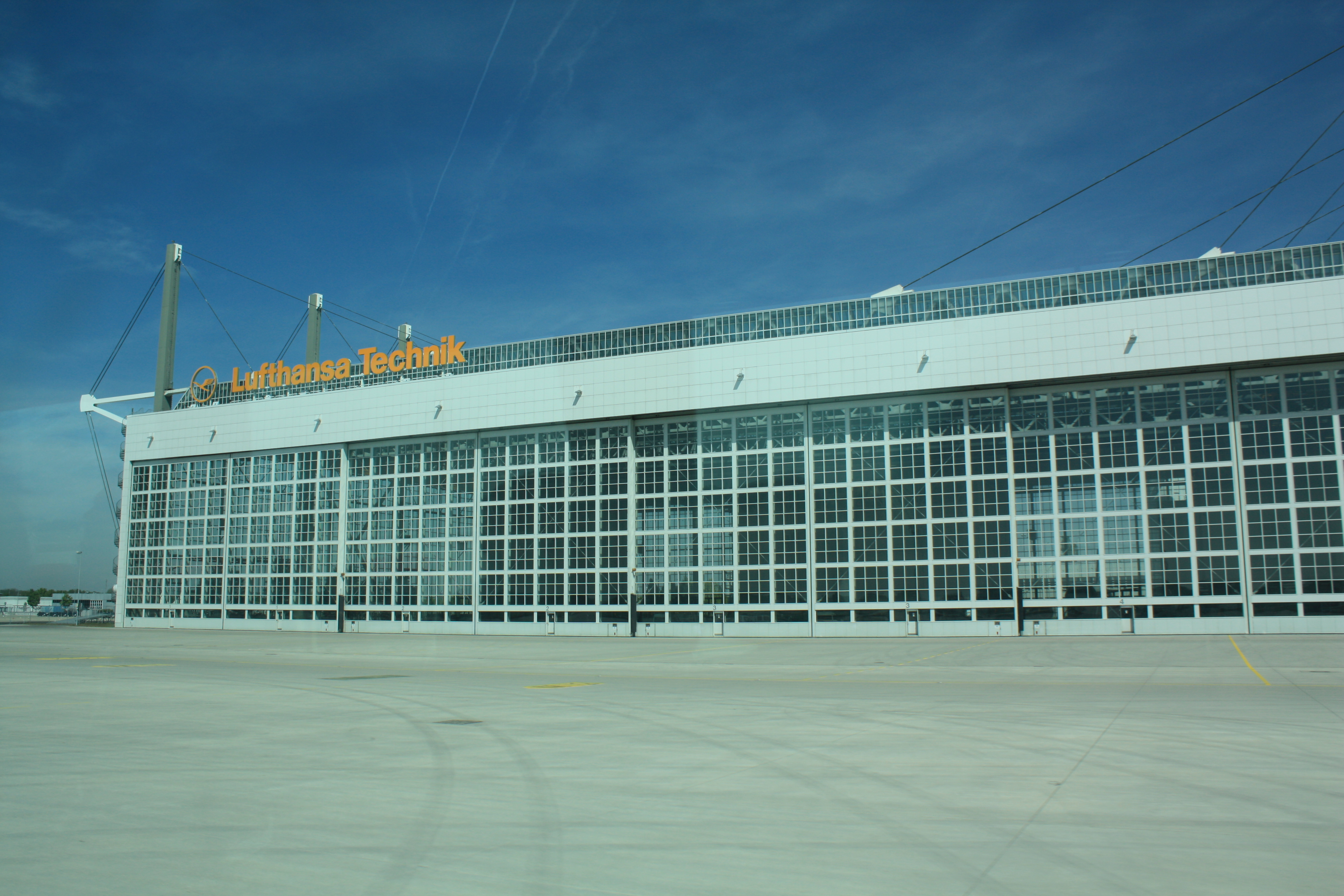
Maintenance hangar of Lufthansa Technik

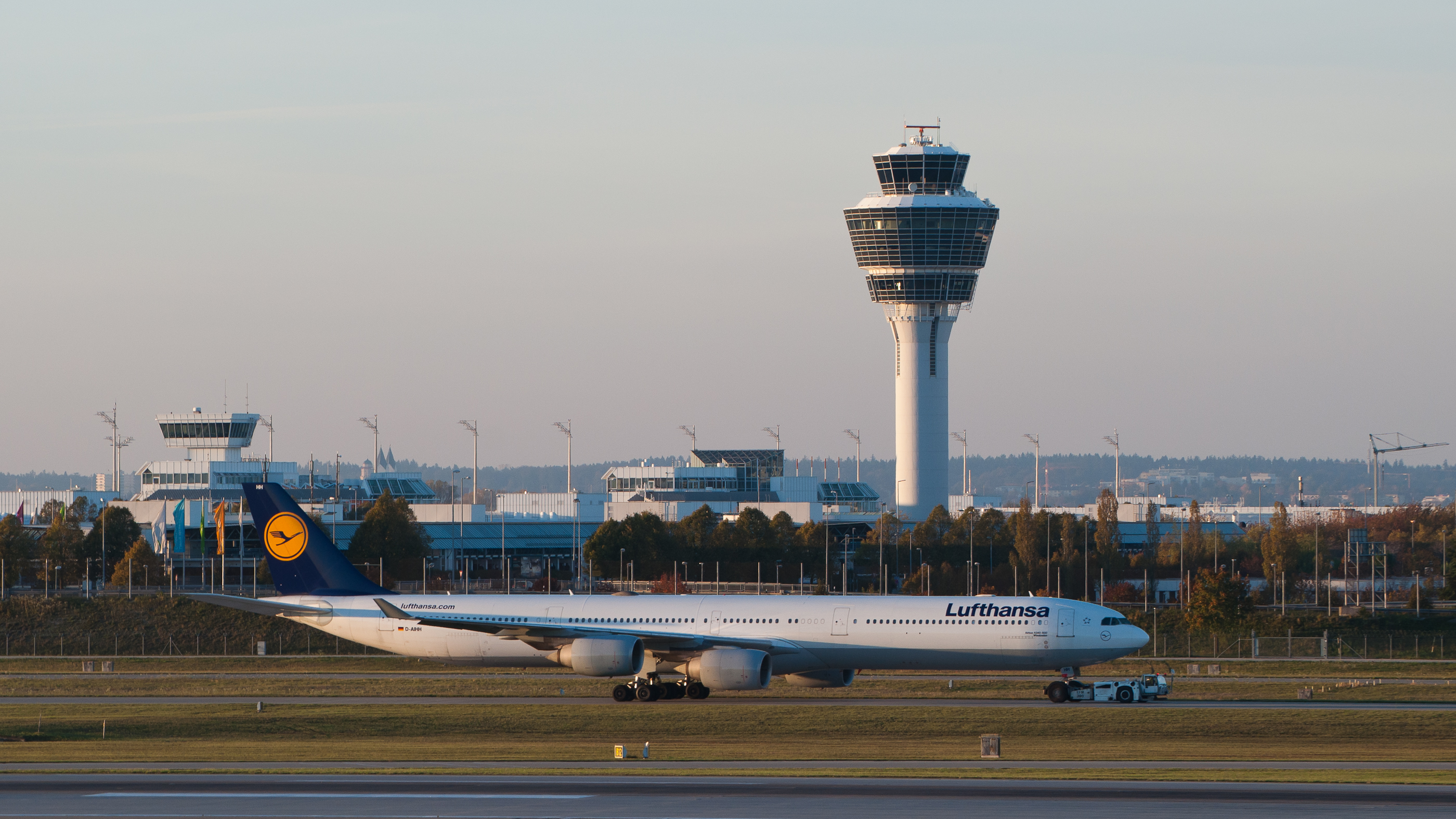
Control tower at Munich Airport

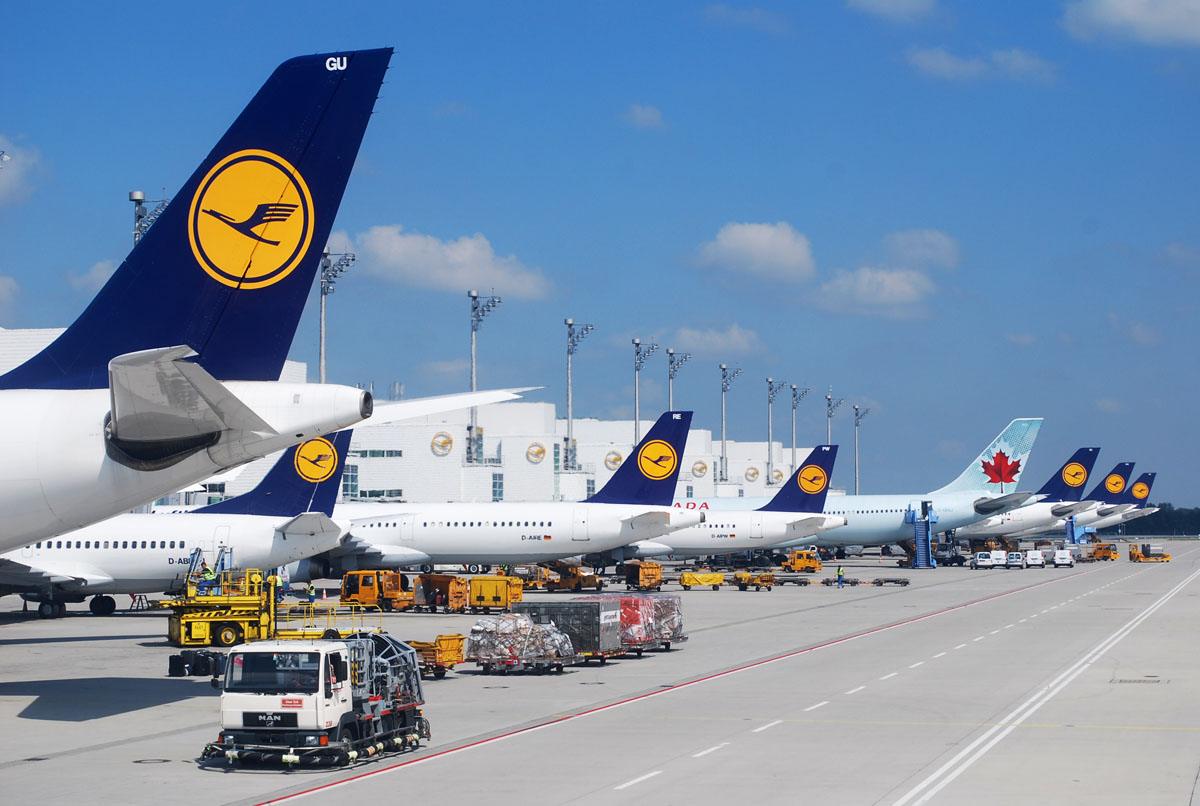
Lufthansa aircraft at Terminal 2

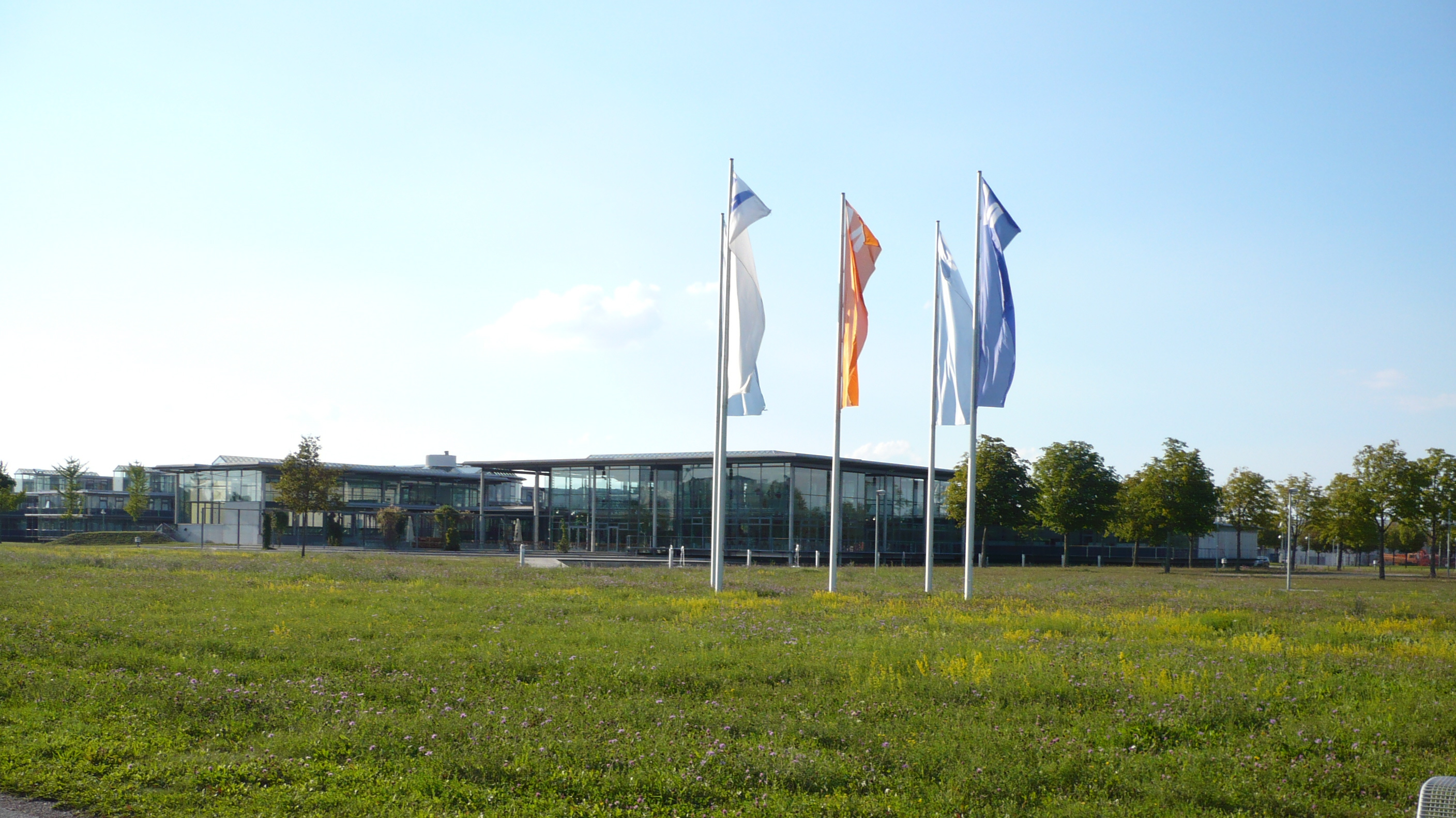
Headquarters of Flughafen München GmbH

Munich Airport hosts several aviation-related operations. Lufthansa maintains a Flight Operations Center for crews based at Munich Airport, and its subsidiary Lufthansa CityLine moved its administration offices from Cologne to the airport in 2014. Lufthansa Technik operates a maintenance facility able to service wide-body aircraft, including the Boeing 747.

Two hotels are located on the airport grounds. The Hilton Munich Airport, originally opened as the Kempinski Hotel Airport Munich and rebranded on 31 December 2014, is situated near Terminal 2, while a Novotel serves the long-term parking area. Additional accommodation is available in nearby communities.

In 2010 Audi opened a training facility at the airport for its dealers, with designated apron areas used for driving instruction.

The German airline DBA, originally Deutsche BA, previously maintained its head office at the airport and in nearby Hallbergmoos.

The helicopter operations division of the Bavarian State Police (Hubschrauberstaffel Bayern) is based at the airport.

== Environment ==
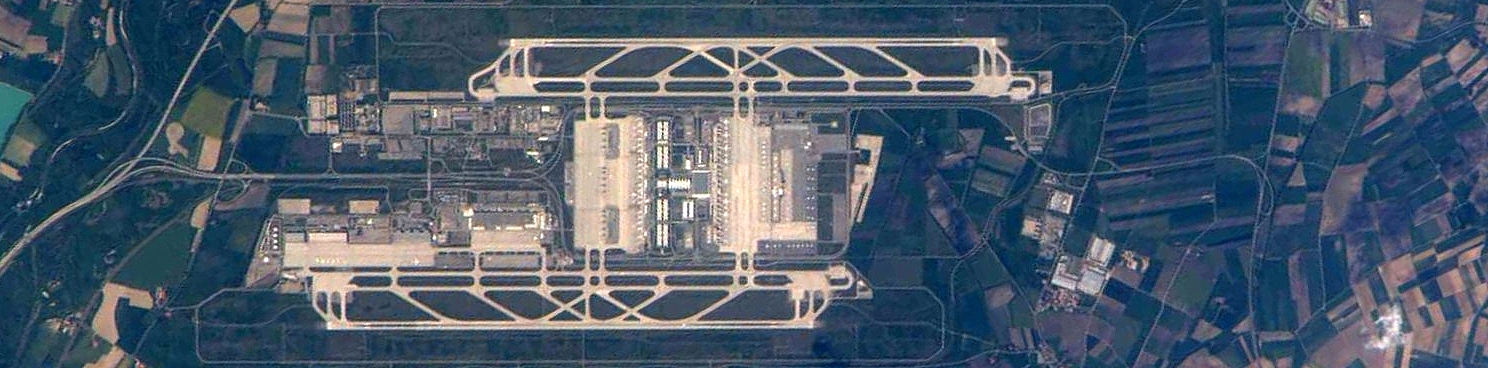
Munich Airport from the International Space Station, c. 2010

Since November 2005, Munich Airport has held a certified environmental management system under ISO 14001 and the Eco-Management and Audit Scheme (EMAS). The airport also participated in the Air Transport Initiative for Germany alongside Fraport, Deutsche Flugsicherung and Lufthansa. Within this framework it developed a "four-pillar strategy" aimed at reducing emissions, improving infrastructure efficiency, optimizing operations and creating economic incentives.

=== Landscape ===
Environmental and nature-conservation aspects were incorporated into the original planning of the site. At the time of opening, about 70% of the grounds were landscaped; today roughly 925 of the airport’s 1,575 hectares remain planted (around 60%). The design took account of the surrounding Erdinger Moos wetlands while also limiting features that attract birds in order to reduce bird strike risk. A 230-acre (93 ha) green belt was established as part of the required compensation areas, which today extend to more than 600 acres (240 ha). Environmental groups, however, have criticised the overall land consumption of the airport and argue that compensation areas are insufficient.

=== Water ===
Construction in the Erdinger Moos required lowering local groundwater levels through drainage works, while existing streams were redirected around or under the site. Airport wastewater and rainwater are returned to the water cycle through an extensive system of sewers, pumping stations and treatment facilities. De-icing chemicals such as glycol are collected in winter and treated biologically before release.

=== Noise ===
Runways were built to 4,000 metres to reduce the need for thrust reversal on landing, though this is partly offset by longer taxi times. A dedicated test hall is used for engine runs, and tests after 23:00 require approval by air traffic control. Airport charges are linked to aircraft noise levels, and 16 fixed monitoring stations track compliance.

Night flights are subject to restrictions. Arrivals and departures are banned between 22:00 and 06:00, with exemptions for mail services, emergency operations and flights authorised by the Bavarian Ministry for Economic Affairs. Limited scheduled flights are permitted under specific conditions between 22:00–24:00 and 05:00–06:00. Local residents have long protested against aircraft noise, particularly at night.

=== Energy ===
Most of the airport’s electricity and heat is supplied by a combined heat and power plant with a generating capacity of 18.5 MW. Surplus heat is stored and reused, and in summer drives absorption chillers. The airport also connects to the regional district heating network.

A photovoltaic system installed on the roof of Terminal 2 in 2003 generates about 445,000 kWh annually, equivalent to the usage of roughly 150 households. Additional facilities include a biofuel filling station for airport and service vehicles.

=== Bird sanctuary ===
The northern part of the Erdinger Moos remains an important habitat for grassland birds such as the northern lapwing, Eurasian curlew and occasional winter visitors like the hen harrier. This area is designated as a bird sanctuary under the EU Birds Directive.

Despite preventive measures, conflicts persist between aviation safety and wildlife protection, and rare birds are occasionally killed by aircraft movements. Plans for a third runway would reduce areas of open grassland within the sanctuary, a proposal criticised by conservation groups.

== Emergency services ==
=== Police ===
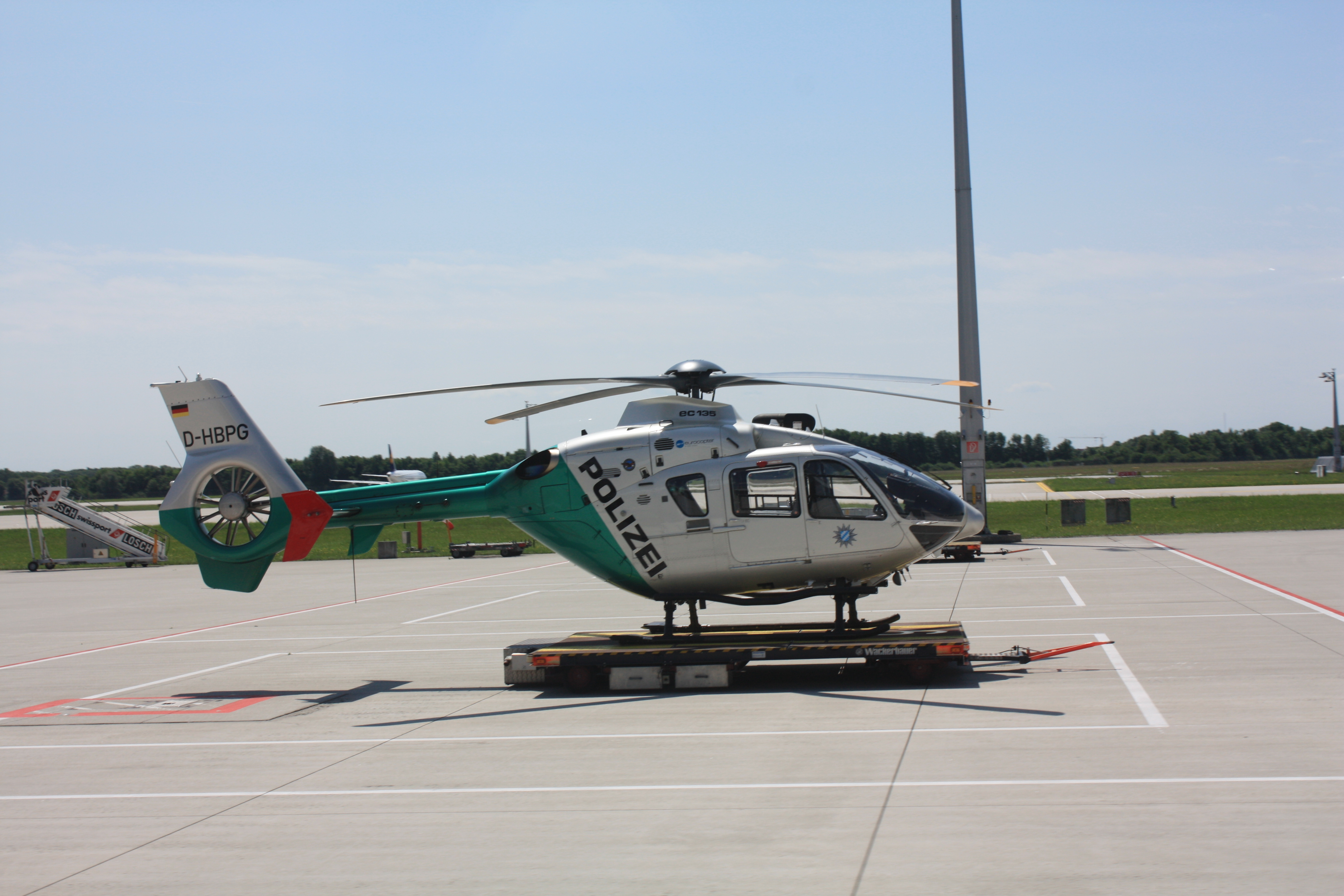
Eurocopter EC135 of the Bavarian State Police at Munich Airport

Responsibility for passenger and operational security lies with the Federal Police, units of the Bavarian State Police (Munich Airport Police Inspection, Police Headquarters Upper Bavaria North), and the security department of Flughafen München GmbH. The airport police station is located at Nordallee 6. Officers are trained for aviation-related incidents.

The Bavarian police helicopter unit is also based at the airport, operating five Eurocopter EC135 helicopters. A relocation of the unit to Schleißheim Airport was planned for 2020.

=== Fire department ===
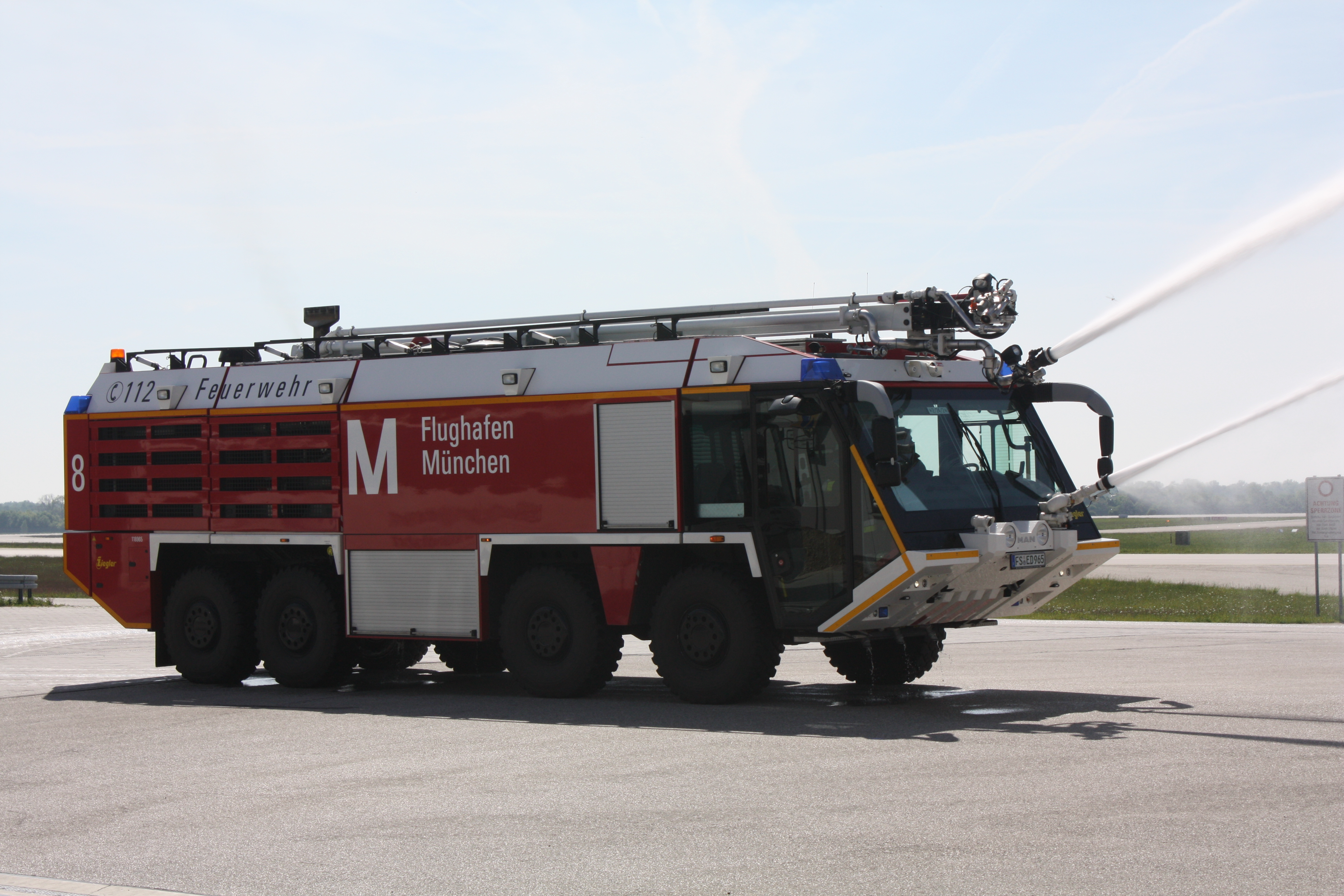
Fire engine of Munich Airport Fire Department

The airport maintains its own fire department with two stations near the runways and a fleet of 32 fire engines. The service is positioned to provide rapid response across the airfield. In major incidents, fire departments from surrounding municipalities can provide additional support; the airport fire service also assists local fire departments in large-scale incidents.

Fire department missions
Year	Total missions*	Fires	Technical assistance	False alarms
2013	3,997	104	1,754	2,139
2012	3,613	107	1,717	1,789
2011	3,582	118	1,831	1,633
2010	3,946	128	2,070	1,748
2009	3,254	118	1,599	1,537
2008	2,999	107	1,389	1,503
2007	2,651	116	1,328	1,207
2006	3,011	123	1,052	1,209
2005	2,095	127	1,103	1,116
2004	2,704	119	950	1,103

*Includes other deployments such as training exercises and guided tours.

=== Ambulance service ===
Emergency medical services at the airport are provided by the Malteser Hilfsdienst under a public service contract. A rescue vehicle is available around the clock and may also respond to calls outside the airport area. Additional regional or supraregional rescue services are dispatched by the regional control center, which coordinates emergency responses across the area.

An emergency physician from the airport medical center is available on site.

== Ground transportation ==
=== Road ===
Munich Airport is accessible via nearby Motorway A 92, which connects to motorway A9 (towards Nuremberg) and Munich's ring motorway A99. Bavarian State Road St. 2584 connects A 92's exit 6 (Flughafen München)—an incomplete interchange that can only be used by traffic to and from the west—to the terminals. Access from the east is possible via exit 8 (Freising Ost) and Bavarian State Road St. 2580, which connects to St. 2584 in the east of the airport.

The north-southbound so-called "Flughafentangente Ost" (literally: airport tangential road east) between A92 and A94 was finally opened in 2010 with a single lane in each direction. Originally, it was planned to be opened as expressway simultaneously with the new Airport. Gradually, the accident-prone road shall be selectively upgraded from 2021 on to two alternating lanes per direction.

It can be reached by bicycle on national highway 301 ("B301") and an airport road branching from this highway into the airport area.

=== Railway ===
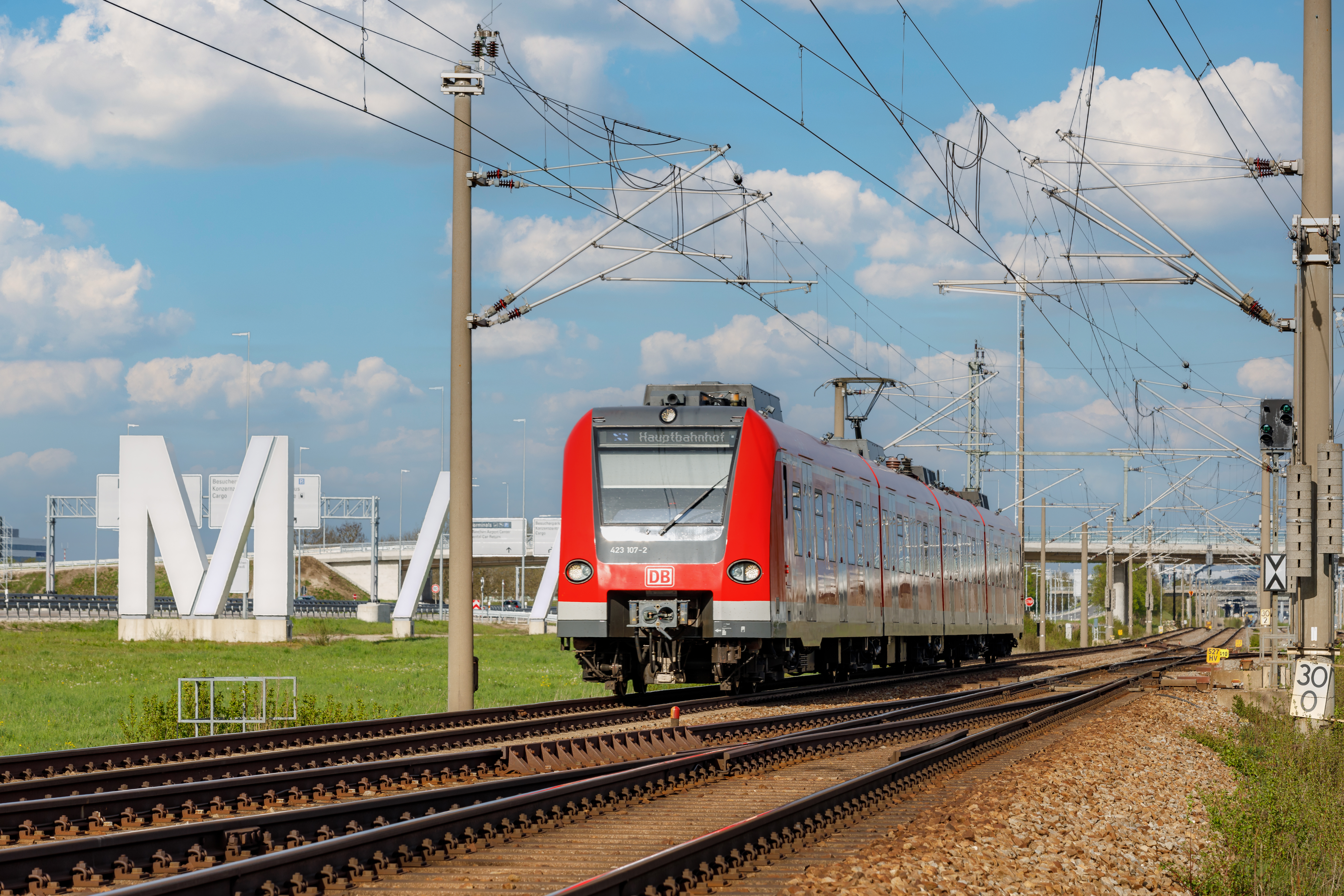
Suburban railway at Munich Airport

On the airport site there are two railway stations. The main one, Munich Airport Terminal station, is located in a tunnel directly beneath the central area between the two passenger terminals. A second station, Besucherpark (German for Visitors' Park), serves the cargo and maintenance areas, long-term parking, administrative buildings and the Visitors’ Park from which it takes its name.

The airport is linked to the Munich S-Bahn network by lines S1 and S8. During the daytime each line runs every 20 minutes. Line S1 approaches from the west via the Munich–Regensburg railway and the northwestern suburbs, while line S8 arrives from the east via the Munich East–Munich Airport railway line. On the trunk section between Laim and Ostbahnhof the two lines run in opposite directions relative to the airport, so that a ten-minute frequency towards the airport is available only at Hauptbahnhof and Ostbahnhof. Night-time services are thinner; the S8 operates essentially around the clock (every 40 minutes roughly between 01:00 and 04:00, otherwise every 20 minutes), while the S1 runs from approximately 03:00/03:30 in the morning until midnight. The journey to Munich Hauptbahnhof takes about 40–45 minutes.

In addition, Regional-Express line RE 22 operates as the Überregionaler Flughafenexpress (ÜFEX). Via the Neufahrner Kurve it provides an hourly service from Regensburg via Freising, Moosburg and Landshut, and since the December 2024 timetable change an extension every two hours via Neumarkt in der Oberpfalz to Nuremberg Hauptbahnhof. The Neufahrner Kurve, a roughly 2.3 km double-track electrified link completed in 2018, connects the Neufahrner Spange (the airport branch) with the Munich–Regensburg line north of Neufahrn bei Freising and thereby enables direct regional trains from eastern Bavaria without a bus transfer at Freising or a detour via Munich city centre. Modern Siemens Mireo trains are used.

A second tunnel beneath the terminals is currently unused. Originally, there were plans to use it for intercity railway, then for a Transrapid maglev train making the trip to München Hauptbahnhof in 10 minutes. However, this project was cancelled in March 2008 due to cost escalation. Discussions regarding a faster connection between Munich city centre and the airport have taken place for several years, as the journey time of 40–60 minutes faces ongoing criticism. Even a rudimentary express suburban railway service is not in sight.

=== Bus ===
MVV regional bus lines connect the airport to the nearby city of Freising as well as Erding and Markt Schwaben. Lufthansa Airport Bus provides an alternative to the S-Bahn, stopping at Nordfriedhof U-Bahn station and Munich Central Station.

Ingolstadt's municipal bus company operates a direct coach service connecting the airport with Ingolstadt, serving Ingolstadt's central bus terminal and Ingolstadt Nord station (Ingolstädter Airport Express).

Lufthansa also operates coach services from Munich Airport to Nuremberg Airport and Innsbruck Airport (available to air passengers only with a connecting flight already including the coach transfer as part of their ticket).

== Public transport projects ==
Since the early 1990s, several proposals have aimed to improve rail access to Munich Airport. Deutsche Bundesbahn initially studied four concepts for connecting the airport to the ICE network at a cost of 500 million to 2 billion Deutsche Mark, but these plans were abandoned in favor of strengthening regional rail links to Munich Hauptbahnhof.

=== Airport Express (S-Bahn) ===
After the cancellation of the proposed Transrapid maglev link, alternative concepts were developed using existing railway infrastructure with limited upgrades.

One such plan, colloquially known as the "Humpel-Express," would have operated on the Munich–Regensburg railway and S1 line with few intermediate stops. Trains were intended to run at speeds up to 200 kilometres per hour (120 mph) every 15 minutes between Hauptbahnhof and the airport. The proposal faced obstacles including extended road closures at level crossings in Fasanerie and Feldmoching, the need for a new alignment through several municipalities, and the construction of a viaduct over the federal highway B471. Public opposition and funding concerns led to the project being abandoned.

A revised Airport Express service is now planned in conjunction with the construction of the second S-Bahn trunk line. Trains would stop only at Marienhof between Hauptbahnhof and Ostbahnhof, reducing travel time to about 30 minutes. Deutsche Bahn has also proposed a four-track underground extension from Leuchtenbergring to Hallbergmoos, which would eliminate bottlenecks at intermediate stations and further reduce journey times to an estimated 15–18 minutes.

=== U-Bahn connections ===
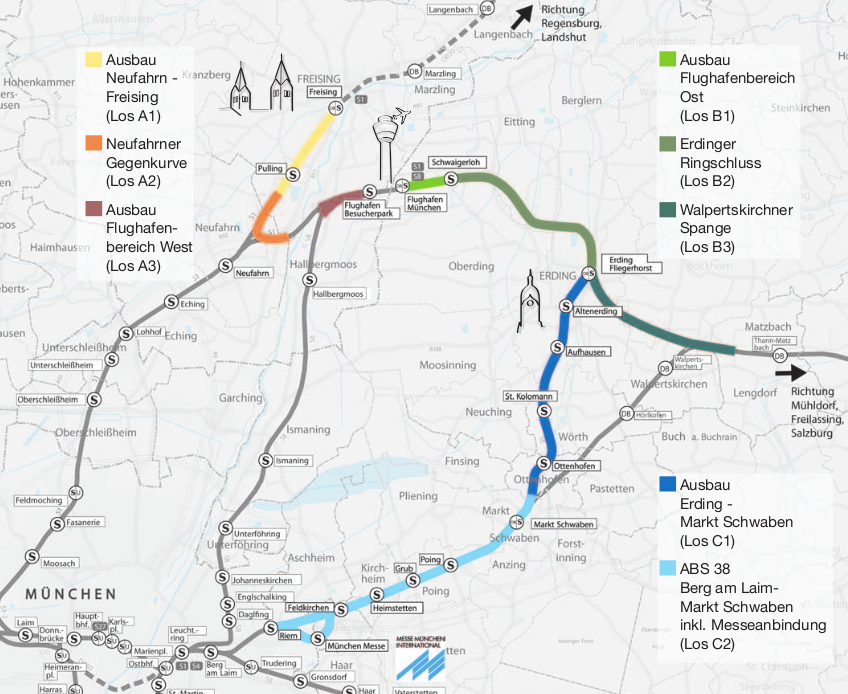
Map of the Erdinger Ring connections with the Walpertskirchen link and Neufahrn Link

Extensions of the Munich U-Bahn to connect with S-Bahn lines serving the airport have also been considered. These would shorten travel times from northern districts of Munich by providing faster access to the S1 line.

In 1996 the opening of the U2 terminus at Feldmoching improved access from Milbertshofen-Am Hart and Feldmoching-Hasenbergl. In 1998 an additional connection was completed near Neufahrn, and in 2010 the extension of the U3 to Moosach linked Schwabing-West and Neuhausen-Nymphenburg directly to the S1 line. A further extension of the U6 from Garching to Neufahrn remains under discussion.

=== Erding Ring Closure ===
The principal long-term rail project is the Erding Ring Closure, intended to improve connections from eastern and south-eastern Bavaria. It comprises an eastward extension of the airport S-Bahn line to Erding (including a new station at Schwaigerloh), together with the roughly 9 km Walpertskirchen link connecting the Markt Schwaben–Munich Airport line with the Munich–Simbach route. Construction of the first section (airport to Schwaigerloh) is under way; the station shell at Schwaigerloh is expected around mid-2026, but opening is delayed by the need to upgrade the existing tunnel under Terminal 2 to current fire-safety and evacuation standards. Further sections and the Walpertskirchen link remain in the planning-approval stage, so completion of the full scheme is not expected before the late 2020s or early 2030s.

=== Intercity Express connections ===
A ICE (Intercity Express) connection using the existing S-Bahn and regional tracks was examined by Deutsche Bahn in 2026 and ruled out as operationally unfeasible because of capacity constraints. DB Fernverkehr continues to support a dedicated long-distance link (for example in the context of an upgraded Munich–Ingolstadt corridor), but no concrete construction timeline exists and realisation is widely regarded as a long-term prospect at best.

== Proposed third runway ==
Plans have been advanced for the construction of a third runway at Munich Airport. The new 4,000-metre (13,000 ft) runway would run parallel to the existing ones and be located northeast of the current north runway.

=== Rationale ===
Between 1997 and 2006 air traffic at Munich grew on average by about 7% per year, and capacity at the two existing runways was reported to be exhausted during peak hours. Airlines seeking new slots at Munich were often denied. A forecast by Intraplan Consult GmbH projected 58.2 million passengers by 2025, assuming continued growth.

According to Flughafen München GmbH (FMG), the operator, a third runway would increase maximum capacity from about 90 to 120 aircraft movements per hour and help position Munich as Germany’s second major hub after Frankfurt Airport.

The plan approval decision by the government of Upper Bavaria in 2011 was supported by the airport’s shareholders (the State of Bavaria, the Federal Republic of Germany, and the City of Munich) and by several business associations, who argued that the expansion was important for regional transport and the economy.

=== Opposition ===
The proposal has been controversial, especially in the districts of Freising and Erding, but also in other surrounding counties. Critics questioned the airport’s traffic forecasts, arguing that demand could be met by operating larger aircraft rather than building new infrastructure.

Opponents formed the alliance *aufgeMUCkt*, an umbrella organization of more than 80 groups including citizens’ initiatives, church groups, and environmental organizations. The campaign was supported by the Bavarian branch of BUND. Demonstrations have been held regularly, including a protest in Munich’s Marienplatz on 29 October 2011 with an estimated 7,000 participants. The Catholic Church, which owns some affected land, also announced that it would not sell property for the project.

=== Planning and legal process ===
The airport operator submitted its application for planning approval in 2007. During the public review period, more than 60,000 objections were filed. In July 2011 the government of Upper Bavaria granted zoning approval, confirming the need for additional capacity. At the same time, the Bavarian Administrative Court rejected lawsuits against the decision, allowing the plan to proceed. The permit is valid for up to 15 years.

In 2012 a local referendum in Munich rejected the project, leading the city (one of the airport’s three shareholders) to withhold approval. In 2015 Germany’s Federal Administrative Court dismissed all remaining complaints and confirmed the legal validity of the expansion plans. However, construction cannot begin without the consent of all three shareholders: the State of Bavaria, the Federal Republic of Germany, and the City of Munich.

In September 2020 the Bavarian government suspended all progress on the third runway until at least 2028, citing the sharp decline in passenger numbers during the COVID-19 pandemic.

If built, the new runway would be designated 08L/26R under ICAO rules (renaming the current north runway 08C/26C). Plans also include a satellite terminal at Terminal 2, which opened in April 2016.

== See also ==
- Memmingen Airport, an airport 110 km (68 mi) from Munich that serves the city with low-cost flights
- List of airports in Germany
- Transport in Germany
