= New Renaissance Pictures =

American media production and distribution company

- Industry: Filmmaking
- Founded: 2005
- Headquarters: La Habra, California, United States
- Key people: Joshua Sikora, President & Founder; Kevin Christensen; Anthony Parisi
- Parent: Sikora Media Group
- Website: www.newrenaissancepictures.com

New Renaissance Pictures is an American independent production and distribution company for film, television, and the web, established in 2005. Since its inception, New Renaissance Pictures has been involved with a variety of groundbreaking new media projects, including WebSerials.com and the multimedia experience The Black Dawn.

== History ==
New Renaissance Pictures launched as one of the first online distributors of short films. By 2006, the company was producing and distributing a variety of award-winning films, including Be the Man (Best African-American Film, DGA Student Film Awards), Wednesday (Jimmy Stewart Crystal Heart Award, Heartland Film Festival) and A Shopping Cart Named Desire (Cinematic Film2Music Competition at the Sundance Film Festival). Also in 2006, the site began to offer HD downloads of select productions. Following the success of Be the Man, New Renaissance once again collaborated with writer/director Matthew Jones on the short film Choices, a drama about a teen preparing to end her unplanned pregnancy.

The company produced its first feature film, The Deserted, in 2006 and followed up that production with two serialized features for the web: Project X and Cataclysmo and the Time Boys. These two productions formed the foundation for WebSerials.com — another division of the Sikora Media Group, launched as a home for serialized web entertainment. YouTube considered these early productions "some of the best dramas the web has to offer." WebSerials.com proved to be a major success, as one of the premiere sites for popular web series, prompting New Renaissance to produce not only a sequel to the highly-popular Cataclysmo but also additional serials for the site.

In 2009, New Renaissance completed its groundbreaking multimedia experience The Black Dawn — a post-apocalyptic, science-fiction drama that spans a feature film, TV series, web serial, short film, comic book, and videoblogs. The cross-platform, story-driven experience gives viewers an unprecedented level of interactivity as they unravel the mystery and follow the characters within the world of The Black Dawn.

Also in 2009, New Renaissance sponsored the first annual Film Music Guild Conference, a forum designed to connect filmmakers and composers and inspire greater community and creativity. Guests included director Pete Docter of Pixar's Up & Monsters, Inc. and John Ottman, the editor & composer of films such as Superman Returns & Valkyrie.

In August 2010, New Renaissance Pictures launched a new web sitcom called Best Laid Plans. The show is completely improvised by the ensemble cast without the use of any scripts.

In 2016 New Renaissance Pictures produced the feature Manifest Destiny: the Lewis & Clark Musical Adventure, a satirical musical-comedy loosely based on the Lewis and Clark Expedition. Directed by Anthony Parisi, the film was adapted from an obscure YouTube series created by Kevin Abrams and Jeremy Hoffman, who reprised their roles of Meriwether Lewis and William Clark respectively. It also starred Jesse Grotholson as Thomas Jefferson and Kristen Terry as Sacagawea.

== See also ==
- Cataclysmo and the Time Boys
