= Cataclysmo and the Time Boys =

American web series

- Genre: Sci-Fi; Comedy
- Created by: Kevin Christensen; Anthony Parisi
- Directed by: Kevin Christensen
- Starring: Brian Walton; Chris Hartwell; Erin Sullivan; Jesse GrothOlson
- Composer: Ian Perry
- Country of origin: United States
- No. of episodes: 24

Production
- Executive producer: Joshua Sikora
- Cinematography: Joshua Sikora
- Editors: Anthony Parisi; Nathan Jeffers
- Camera setup: Single-camera
- Running time: About 5 minutes per episode

Original release
- Network: WebSerials.com; YouTube
- Release: July 27, 2007 – January 18, 2008

Related
- Cataclysmo and the Battle for Earth

Cataclysmo and the Time Boys is weekly web serial produced by New Renaissance Pictures. It is distributed by WebSerials.com and is available on YouTube and the Vuze network. Cataclysmo and the Time Boys consists of 24 episodes, each about 5 minutes in length. As of October 2009, the serial had more than 1 million views on YouTube. Cataclysmo and the Time Boys premiered on July 27, 2007.

== Plot ==
Two heroes from a war-weary future travel back in time to stop the war in its origins. The 'Time Boys' confront the evil Dr. Crankshaft, evil monkeys and ally themselves with the lovely Samantha.

== Cast ==
Johnny Zanzibar (played by Brian Walton)
Bucky Stallion (played by Chris Hartwell)
Samantha (played by Erin Sullivan)
Dr. Crankshaft (played by Jesse GrothOlson)
H.G. Welles (played by Nate Bell)
Mildred Crankshaft (played by Kenlyn Kanouse)
Reporter (played by Shevaun Kastl)
Surfer Dude (played by Gabe Renfro)
Government Dudes (played by Derek Houck & Jonathan Nation)
Steve the Neighbor (played by Nathan Jeffers)
Private Bobby (played by Anthony Parisi)
Store Clerk (played by Thomas Minelga)

== Episodes ==
The following is a list of episodes from the popular web serial, Cataclysmo and the Time Boys.

The series ran from July 27, 2007 through January 18, 2008.

=== Season 1 ===
Title	Director	Writer(s)	Original Airdate	Production Code
"Under Crimson Sky"	Kevin Christensen	Kevin Christensen, Anthony Parisi & Joshua Sikora	July 24, 2007	101
Johnny Zanzibar leads his men into battle in a desperate attempt to recover a stolen radio.
"They Died With Their Pants On"	Kevin Christensen	Joshua Sikora	August 3, 2007	102
As his men fight for their lives, Johnny must recover the radio. Meanwhile, Bucky finds himself with more than cooking to do.
"In the Land of the Blind"	Kevin Christensen	Joshua Sikora	August 10, 2007	103
After the battle, Johnny and Bucky are given an urgent mission from a very surprising source.
"Men Like Gods"	Joshua Sikora	Joshua Sikora	August 17, 2007	104
Johnny and Bucky have their new mission—and in order to stop Cataclysmo, they must travel...back in time!
"The House at the End of the World"	Kevin Christensen	Anthony Parisi	August 24, 2007	105
Arriving in the present, the Time Boys immediately begin their search for Cataclysmo. Meanwhile, H.G. Wells runs into trouble.
"Strangers in a Strange Land"	Kevin Christensen	Anthony Parisi	August 31, 2007	106
Continuing their search for Cataclysmo, Johnny and Bucky target their first suspect.
"The Day the Internet Stood Still"	Kevin Christensen	Anthony Parisi & Kevin Christensen	September 7, 2007	107
Back at Sam's apartment, the Time Boys search the internet for clues, but are interrupted by surprise visitors.
"Meanwhile, In the Underwater Lab..."	Kevin Christensen	Anthony Parisi	September 14, 2007	108
Meanwhile, in an underwater lab, Dr. Solomon Crankshaft demonstrates his latest experiment to the government.
"Across the Stars"	Kevin Christensen	Anthony Parisi	September 21, 2007	109
Although separated by five centuries of history, Bucky and Sam find they have a lot in common as they reminisce about broken dreams while stargazing under a moonlit sky.
"Gorillas In Our Midst"	Kevin Christensen	Kevin Christensen	September 28, 2007	110
While the Time Boys sleep peacefully, an army of gorillas travel through the portal in order to wreak havoc on the world!
"Monkey Bar Skirmish"	Kevin Christensen	Kevin Christensen	October 5, 2007	111
When the gorillas ransack a local park, it's up to the Time Boys to save the day!
"A Close Call"	Kevin Christensen	Kevin Christensen	October 12, 2007	112
With new information about Cataclysmo, Sam races to find the Time Boys so that they can stop Dr. Crankshaft...
"Trapped Under the Tide"	Kevin Christensen	Anthony Parisi	October 19, 2007	113
Kidnapped by Dr. Crankshaft and taken to his underwater lab, Sam tries to convince the mad scientist that his experiment could end the world.
"The Underwater Demise"	Kevin Christensen	Anthony Parisi	October 26, 2007	114
Arriving at the pier, Johnny and Bucky search for Dr. Crankshaft and his lab.
"Forget Me Not"	Kevin Christensen	Joshua Sikora	November 2, 2007	115
Having disposed of the Time Boys, Dr. Crankshaft returns home to finish his experiment.
"Sands of Chaos"	William Hellmuth	Joshua Sikora	November 9, 2007	116
With only hours until the end of the world, who will stop Cataclysmo?
"The Origin of Species"	Kevin Christensen	Joshua Sikora	November 16, 2007	117
With the Time Boys on their way back to the Cookie Lady's house, Dr. Crankshaft prepares to test his new serum.
"The Food of the Gods and How It Came To Earth"	Kevin Christensen	Joshua Sikora	November 30, 2007	118
While Dr. Crankshaft works to find the anti-virus, Bucky and Sam bond over chocolate chip cookies and Johnny is sent on an urgent mission.
"The Shape of Things To Come"	Joshua Sikora	Joshua Sikora	December 7, 2007	119
And now for something completely different...
"Blockade Runners"	William Hellmuth	Joshua Sikora	December 14, 2007	120
Returning with the salt, Johnny must make it past a dozen gorillas with the help of Bucky and Sam.
"The Last Stand"	William Hellmuth	Joshua Sikora	December 21, 2007	121
As the gorilla army descends upon the house, Johnny, Bucky, and Sam make their final stand.
"Heart of Darkness"	William Hellmuth	Joshua Sikora	January 4, 2007	122
Our heroes find themselves trapped by the gorillas.
"The Good, The Mad, and The Ugly"	Kevin Christensen	Joshua Sikora	January 11, 2008	123
Johnny takes a stand in a dangerous face off with the army of gorillas.
"There's No Place Like Home"	Kevin Christensen	Kevin Christenson, Anthony Parisi & Joshua Sikora	January 18, 2008	124
The end is here.

== Reception and Sequel ==
The serial was well-received on its release, spawning a sequel in 2008. Web series critics praised the series for its clever humor, fun tone, and memorable visual effects. The sequel, entitled Cataclysmo and the Battle for Earth, premiered April 4, 2008. Brian Walton, Chris Hartwell, Erin Sullivan, and Nate Bell reprised their roles from the first serial. Impressing critics with its bold and epic style, Battle for Earth maintained the fun tone of the original, while pushing the story in unexpected new directions. The sequel was directed by Anthony Parisi and written by Kevin Christensen, Anthony Parisi, & Joshua Sikora.

== See also ==
- The Black Dawn
