= Neufahrn Link =

Coordinates: 48.3354°N 11.7052°E

Neufahrn–München Flughafen West junction link
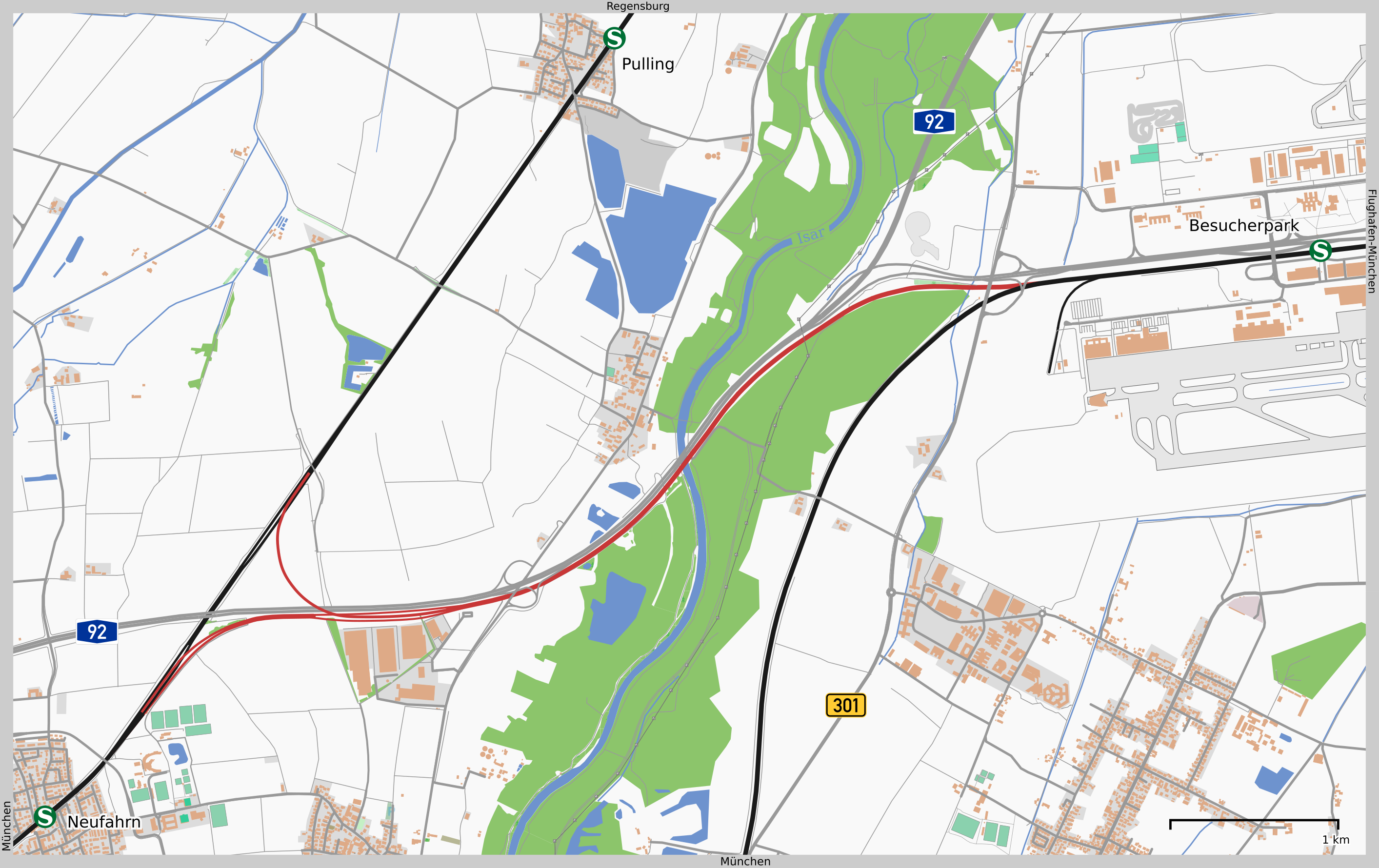

Overview
- Native name: Neufahrner Spange
- Owner: DB Netz
- Line number: 5557
- Locale: Bavaria, Germany

Service
- Operator(s): S-Bahn München, DB Regio

Technical
- Line length: 7.3 km (4.5 mi)
- Number of tracks: 2 throughout
- Track gauge: 1,435 mm (4 ft 8 1/2 in) standard gauge
- Electrification: 15 kV/16.7 Hz AC catenary

The Neufahrn Link (German: Neufahrner Spange) is a double-track and electrified main line in the German state of Bavaria. It connects the Munich–Regensburg railway with Munich Airport.

== Route ==
The line branches to the northeast from Neufahrn bei Freising station at a grade-separated junction from the Munich–Regensburg railway. After a few hundred metres it meets the A92 autobahn and then runs parallel with it. In Achering it passes under the B11 at Freising South interchange. After that, the line runs along the autobahn through the Isar grassland, crosses the Isar and then follows the airport access road. Just before the perimeter of the airport, it reaches München Flughafen (Munich Airport) West junction on the Munich East–Munich Airport railway.

== History ==
After the opening of the Munich Airport in 1992, the only line that connected it to the rail network was the Munich East–Munich Airport railway. The Neufahrn Link was built to establish a second connection. The first sod was turned for the construction on 18 March 1997 and the line was opened on 29 November 1998.

As part of the Erding Ring Closure (Erdinger Ringschluss) project, to improve the airport's connections to eastern Bavaria, the so-called Neufahrner Kurve ("Neufahrn Curve") was opened in December 2018. The curve branches off to the north before Neufahrn station to cross the A 92 and connects to the line towards Freising and Regensburg.

== Operations ==
The line is served at 20-minute intervals by the of the Munich S-Bahn. This runs from Munich East via the S-Bahn trunk line and the Munich–Regensburg railway to Neufahrn. Here trains are usually uncoupled. The front section continues on to Freising and the rear section runs over the Neufahrn Link to the airport. In addition to the S-Bahn, occasional freight trains run to the airport.

The ÜFEX (German: Überregionaler Flughafenexpress, "supra-regional airport express") is an hourly train between the airport and Regensburg Hauptbahnhof which began operating on 9 December 2018 via the Neufahrn Curve.

== Future ==
At the eastern end of the link, the current level junction with the Munich East–Munich Airport railway will be replaced with a new flying junction, which will reduce conflicts with the S-Bahn trains. The project costs an estimated €125 million. Completion is planned by the end of 2028.
