= Flughafen München GmbH =

Operator of Munich Airport

Flughafen München GmbH (FMG), based in Munich, is the operator of Munich Airport. Jost Lammers has been CEO and Chairman of the Management Board since January 1, 2020. Nathalie Leroy is responsible for Finance and Infrastructure. From November 1, 2021, Jan-Henrik Andersson will be responsible for Commercial and Security. Albert Füracker is Chairman of the Supervisory Board.

Logo

== History ==
The corporation was established as "Flughafen München-Riem Gesellschaft mbH" on the 12 October 1949 by the Free State of Bavaria and the Bavarian capital Munich. CEO at the time was Wulf-Dieter Graf zu Castell, who held this position until 1972. Also that year, the expansion of the runway to 1,907 meters in length and 60 meters width began and was completed on 22 November. More than a million passengers came through the airport over the course of the year 1962. In 1963, a commission began to search for a new location for the airport. In 1969, the company renamed and became the "Flughafen München GmbH". The relocation of Munich Airport Riem to the new location between Erding and Freising was carried out on 17 May 1992. The expansion of the airport, Terminal 2, financed by Lufthansa (40%) and FMG (60%) together, was opened on 27 June 2003. The company contributed significantly to the development of the Munich airport in order to make it one of the most important air transport hubs in Europe, however the 2005 planned expansion for a third runway remains highly controversial with the resident population.

In September 2014, the supervisory board stopped plans from directors Kerkloh and Weyer to participate in foreign airport operations.

== Ownership ==
Partners are the Free State of Bavaria with a share of 51 percent, the Federal Republic of Germany with 26 percent and the state capital Munich with 23 percent.

== Literature ==
Aspach, Ingo (1999). Wie im Flug (in German). Piper. ISBN 978-3-492-04071-6.
