= Erding Ring Closure =

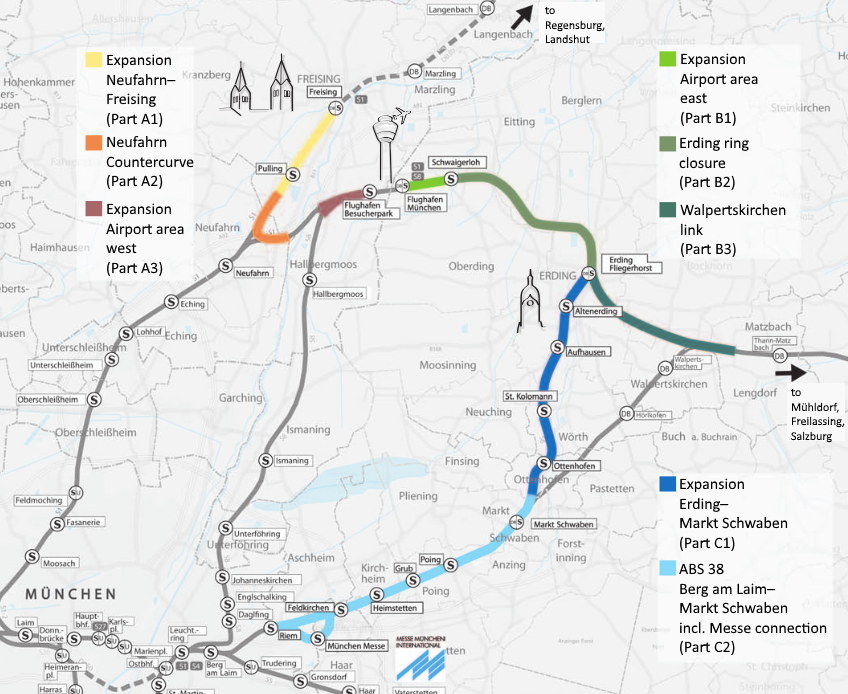
- Planning overview from Bavarian Transport Ministry with Erding Ring Closure, S-Bahn expansion and Walpertskirchen Link

Overview
- Native name: Erdinger Ringschluss
- Line number: 5559
- Locale: Bavaria, Germany

Technical
- Track gauge: 1,435 mm (4 ft 8 1/2 in) standard gauge
- Electrification: 15 kV/16.7 Hz AC overhead catenary

The Erding ring closure (German: Erdinger Ringschluss) is a project to build a 30.2-kilometre (18.8 mi) long, double-track railway that is planned to run from Freising via Munich Airport to Erding.

== Route ==
Line 5559 would run from Freising station as a four-track line together with line 5500 (the Munich–Regensburg railway) to Neufahrn North junction (Abzweig Neufahrn-Nord). It would run over the "Neufahrn counter curve" (Neufahrner Gegenkurve) to reach line 5557 (the Neufahrn Link) at Neufahrn East junction (Abzweig Neufahrn-Ost) and connect with line 5556 (Munich East–Munich Airport railway) at Airport West junction (Abzweig Flughafen-West). From there the existing double-track line would be shared through the airport. The route from Freising to Munich Airport is 16.3 kilometres (10.1 mi) long.

The route would continue under the eastern apron of Munich Airport in a tunnel until it resurfaces near Schwaigerloh. It would then run above ground to Erding. In the Schweigerloh area it is intended to build a system for turning trains, so trains coming from Regensburg or Landshut to stop at the airport could be reversed.

After another 13.2 kilometres (8.2 mi) a junction station would be built on the grounds of the Erding Air Base that can accommodate both Munich S-Bahn trains and regional trains from the southeast using the “Walpertskirchen link” (Walpertskirchener Spange). The current station in the centre of Erding, which is 700 metres away, would then be closed. Trains would continue towards Munich on the existing Markt Schwaben–Erding railway. The section between the Altenerding station and the current Erding Station would be tunneled or lowered in order to avoid congestion at two level crossings (Haager Straße and Dorfener Straße). The resulting open space is planned to be redeveloped as residential and green areas.

=== "Neufahrn counter curve" (Neufahrner Gegenkurve) ===
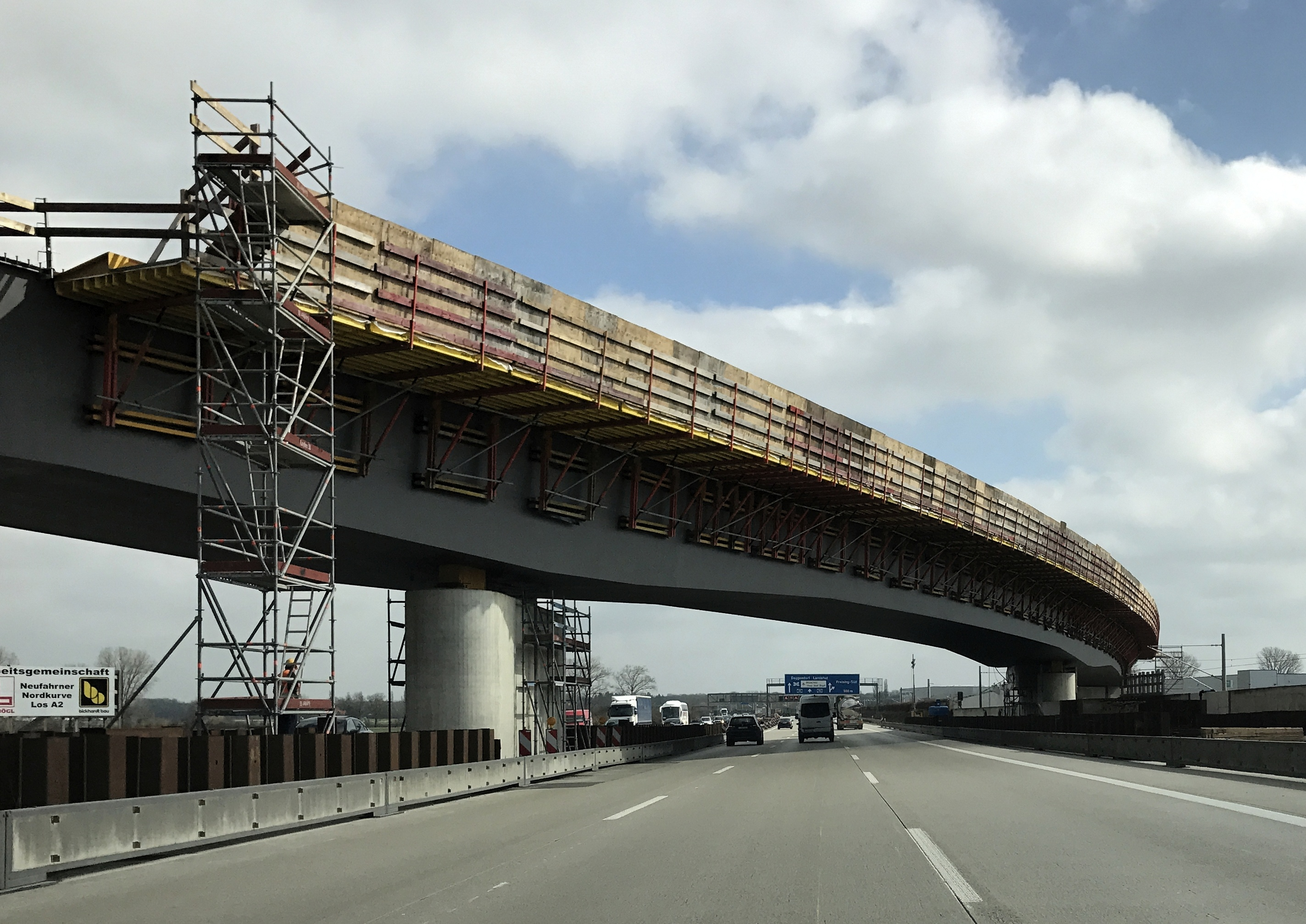
Bridge of the Neufahrn counter curve over the highway A92, March 2017

The main construction work began in early October 2014. The line opened in late 2018 with regular train services commencing in December 2018.

== Planning ==
The Neufahrn counter curve was constructed first to improve airport access from north and east Bavaria. This allows for direct operation of long distance and S-Bahn trains from Landshut via Moosburg and Freising to Munich Airport. In conjunction with the Erding Ring Closure, trains could continue via Dorfen to Mühldorf and Salzburg. Planning approval was given in November 2012 and construction was planned to start in the second half of 2013 but in May 2014 the project was still in planning. An upgrade of the existing railway line to four tracks is initially not intended as an additional S-Bahn station in Mintraching is still being considered. The construction cost is estimated to be € 85 million.

A project management office was established at the end of January 2007 for the preparation of tenders for the design of the line. The obtaining of planning approval is to be carried out in three phases (Freising–airport, airport–Erding and Erding–Munich). 33 kilometres (21 mi) of new railway lines will be built and about 42 kilometres (26 mi) of existing lines will be upgraded. A 1.4-kilometre (0.9 mi) railway tunnel is necessary for the improvement of the rail link to the airport. 85 bridges will be built or modified. 15 stations will be adapted and the creation of three new S-Bahn stations will be examined in the preliminary design.

Since late 2009, several options for a route in the town of Erding have been issued for public discussion. In May 2012, Erding Town Council decided to support the so-called Nordeinschleifung (northern loop) of the regional railway from Walpertskirchen. The construction of the Airport–Erding section would require that the military withdraw from the Erding Air Base in time because the base includes a section of the line and the site of the new station, although no precise timing has yet been announced.

=== Planned services ===
After completion of all parts of the Erding Ring Closure the following services would be provided:

- 20 pairs of trains daily: trans-regional airport express (Überregionaler Flughafenexpress, ÜFEX, every hour) from Salzburg to Regensburg with stops in Mühldorf, Dorfen, Erding, airport, Freising, Moosburg and Landshut;
- 20 pairs of trains daily: airport express (Flughafenexpress, FEX, every hour) from Mühldorf to Landshut via the airport and Freising with more intermediate stops;
- S-Bahn service from Erding via the airport to Freising (every 15 minutes in the peak hour and every 30-minute at other times).

== Walpertskirchen link ==
The Walpertskirchen link is a 9.5-kilometre (5.9 mi) long, single-track, electrified railway line that would connect Erding with the Munich–Mühldorf railway. It would be used by regional trains running from Landshut through the airport to Mühldorf. Similarly, a further extension would use the Mühldorf–Salzburg line, carrying international long-distance services from Munich to Salzburg.
