= Film Music Guild =

- Abbreviation: FMG
- Location: La Mirada, CA
- Parent organization: Biola University
- Website: http://www.filmmusicguild.com

The Film Music Guild (FMG) is a student organization at Biola University in La Mirada, CA. The Film Music Guild was formed to teach film students about music and music students about film.

== History ==
The Film Music Guild was formed in 2006 by composition student Dave Martina to fill the gap between Biola's music and film departments.

== The FMG Conference ==
On October 3, 2009, the Film Music Guild hosted the first annual Film Music Guild Conference (called the FMG Conference 2009). Speakers included Pete Docter (director, Up, Monsters, Inc.), John Ottman (editor and composer, Valkyrie, Superman Returns, X2: X-Men United), Christopher Young (composer, Spider-Man 3, The Grudge, Ghost Rider), and many others.
