= Bergmannstraße =

Street in Munich, Germany

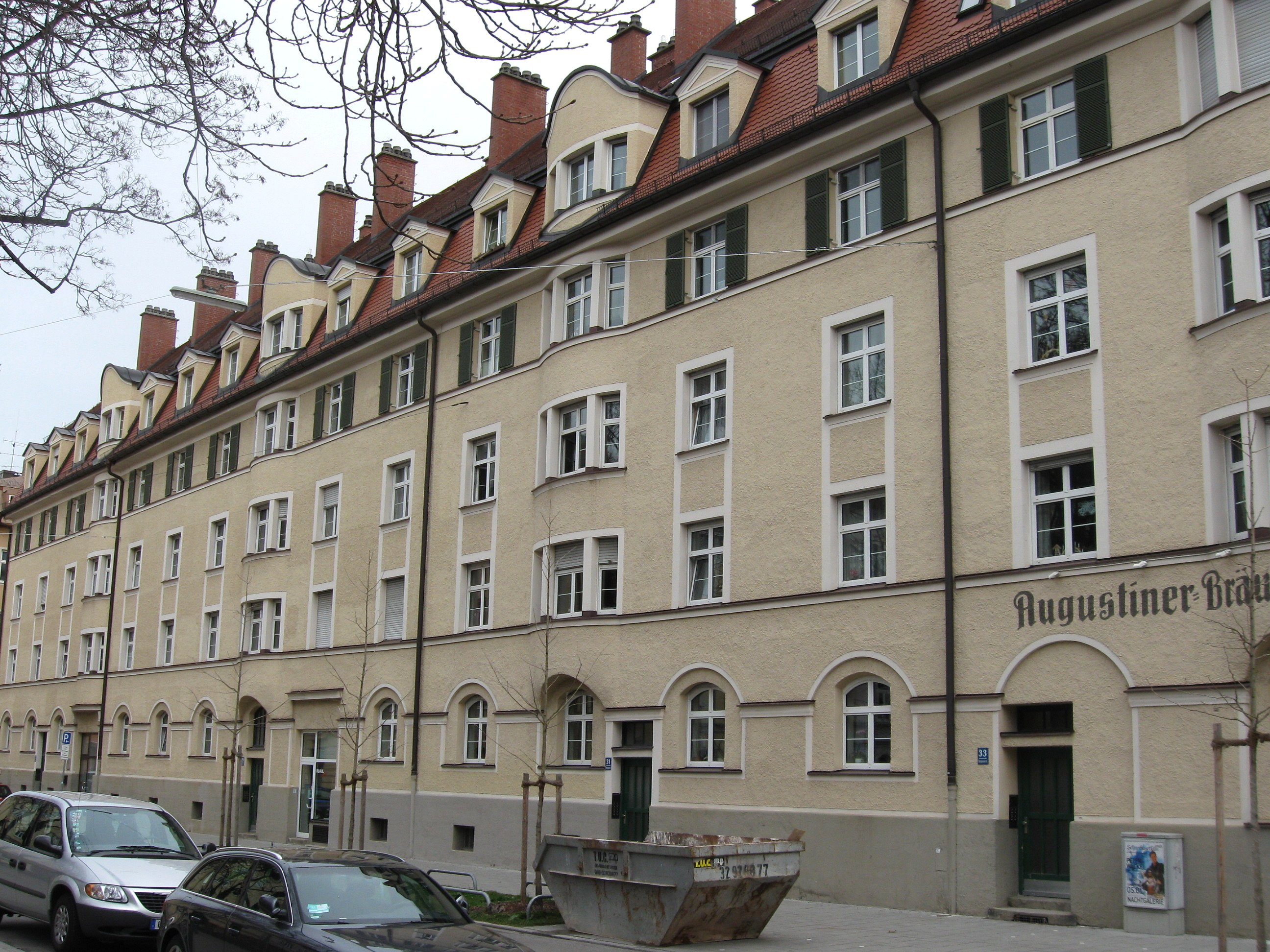
- Bergmannstraße 27-33

- Location within Germany
- Namesake: Michael Adam Bergmann
- Length: 850 m (2,790 ft)
- Location: Munich
- Postal code: 80339
- Nearest metro station: Schwanthalerhöhe (U4)
- Coordinates: 48.136604°N 11.537229°E
- Major junctions: Landsberger Straße, Westendstraße, Tulbeckstraße, Gollierstraße, Heimeranstraße, Anglerstraße, Ridlerstraße

The Bergmannstraße (German pronunciation: [ˈbɛʁkmanˌʃtʁaːsə]) is a street in Munich and lies west of the city center. It leads from Landsberger Straße in the north to Ridlerstraße in the south and is located in the district of Schwanthalerhöhe. The formerly referred to as Sendlinger way road, was named in 1883 after the lawyer, historian and archivist Michael Adam von Bergmann (1733–1783), who was city chief judge starting in 1762 and then became mayor in Munich.

== Location ==
The Bergmannstraße is located in the district Schwanthalerhöhe and in the district of Westend, a classic working-class district with cooperative buildings from the period around 1900. The district is, with about 30,000 inhabitants in an area of just over two square kilometers, one of the most densely populated districts in Munich. The proportion of foreigners is 34.5% (as of 2015), one of the highest in the city. The rental prices here in comparison with the other municipalities of Munich are at a medium level.

The Bergmannstraße is centrally located in the district and runs in a north–south direction for a length of almost 900 meters. The western parallel road is the Trappentreustraße, part of the Bundesstraße 2 R, but mostly runs underground through the Trappentreutunnel. North of the Bergmannstraße runs the multiple track railway lines from about 1.5 kilometers east of the München Hauptbahnhof (main train station), south of the Bergmannstraße the branching tracks of the Munich South Ring run towards the Munich East station and from there, on towards Rosenheim and Salzburg. The Theresienwiese, where the annual Munich Oktoberfest takes place, is located about 800 meters east of the Bergmannstraße.

== Road direction ==
Bergmannstraße branches off to the south of Landsberger Straße, a major arterial road that runs parallel to the Munich-Augsburg railway line, connecting the city center with the western districts and continuing in the direction of Landsberg am Lech.

The northern part of the Bergmannstraße is dominated mostly by simple four-storey to five-storey rental units and individual small businesses. In the middle part of the street, on the western side, lies the Gollierplatz, a green area of about 10,000 square meters. On the east side of the street is a historically listed multi-storey residential complex from the early 1920s. South of it stands the Ledigenheim (asylum for unmarried people), which was built as a Rohziegelbau (brick building) in the new objectivity style under the direction of the architect Theodor Fischer, originating from Lower Franconia, in the years 1925–1927. On the west side of the road, just south of Gollierplatz, is the building of the elementary school (now a primary school) from 1889 to 1891, built in Neo-Renaissance style. A little further south is a three-winged complex arranged around a forecourt, built in factual forms with slightly expressionistic impact in the years 1928 to 1931 and also called Green Block due to the light green color.

Further south, on the east side of the street, there is a post office from the years 1926 to 1928 in the new objectivity style. At the southern end of the Bergmannstraße, on the west side, are several rental units from the years 1898 to 1909, built in the Neo-Baroque style or in Art Nouveau style.

The Bergmannstraße connects at its southern end, to the Ridlerstraße which runs parallel to the railway line of the Südring, which leads from the main station to Ostbahnhof.

== History ==
As long as Neuhausen was not a parish of its own, the Sendlinger Weg was also the Kirchweg, since baptisms, weddings and festive church services took place in the Sendlinger parish church of St. Margaret. It was not until 1871 that the Winthirkirche became a vicarage church and finally in 1882 a parish church. The paved dirt road ran like today's Donnersbergerstraße, leading slightly to the east at the height of the present Richelstraße, crossing the railway tracks at the height of the Maillingerstraße and then leading on to the later Bergmannstraße to the old Sendlinger church. With the extension of today's Maillingerstraße, the Bergmannstraße was also extended to the Burgfriendensgrenze (border of the castle precincts) from 1846 to 1852. Since today's Bergmannstraße was on the municipal boundary of Neuhausen and Sendling, there was still paving duties charged in 1865, for example, when a wedding party wanted to cross the border. In 1877, the Sendling community was incorporated, as a result, the dirt road came into the Munich city planning sovereignty. After the renaming of Haderer Weg in Westendstraße in coordination with the incorporation of the town, the designation of Bergmannstraße followed in 1883.

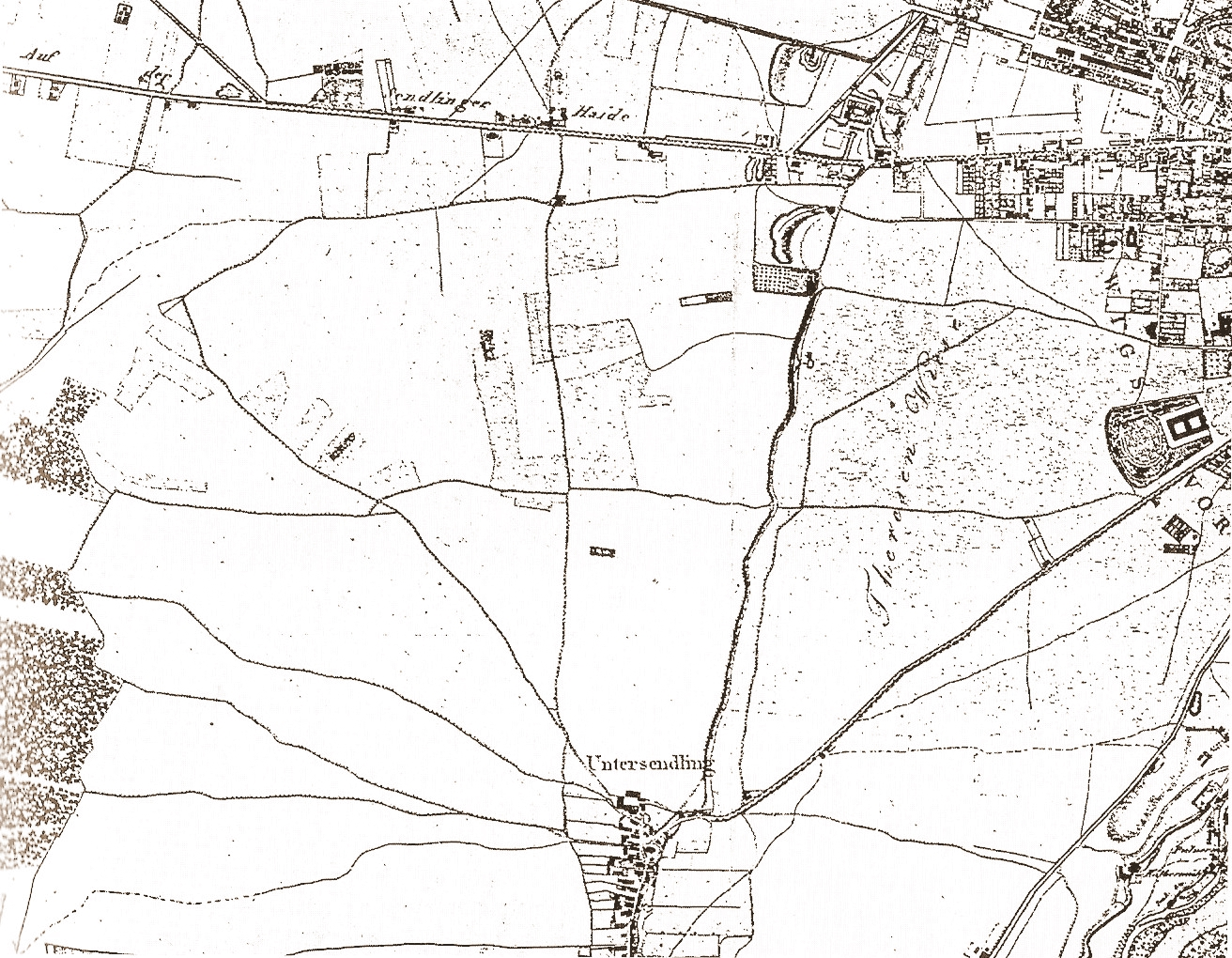
Map Untersendling and Theresienwiese from 1812

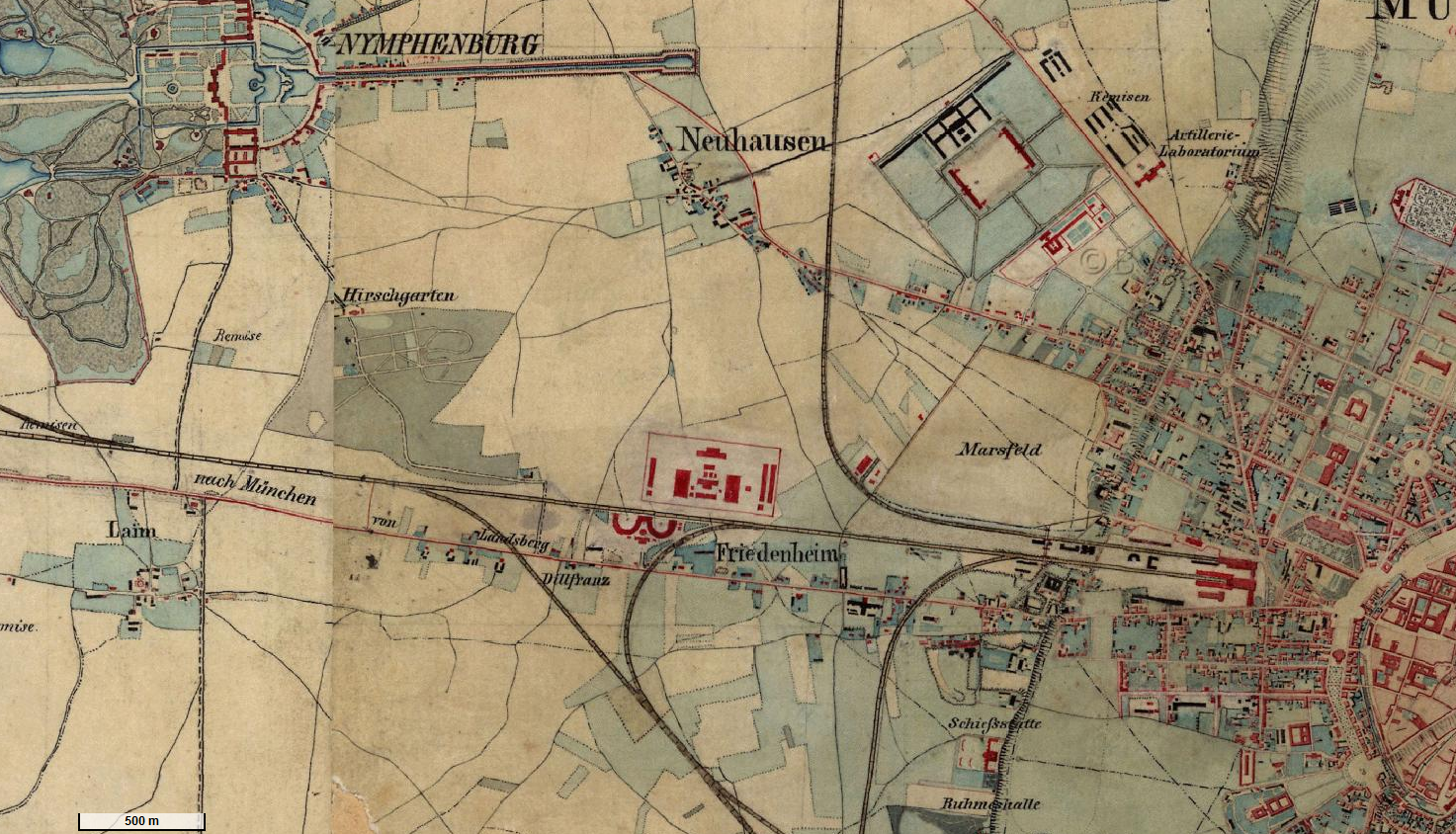
Original position sheet 1856

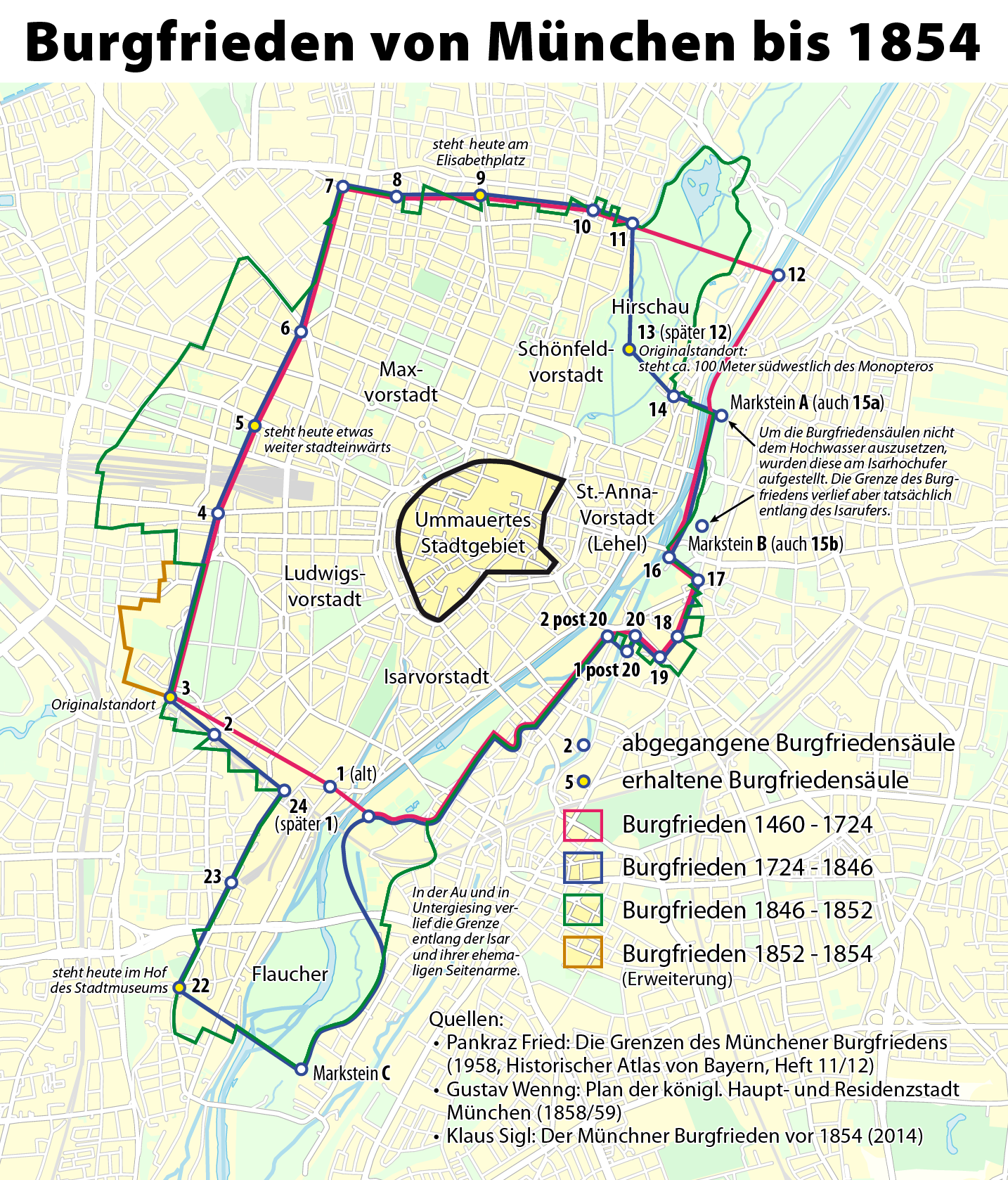
Map of the Burgfrieden (castle precincts) of Munich, green line 1846 to 1852

Plan of the royal main and Residenzstadt (seat of royal power) Muenchen, 1858/59 by Gustav Wenng

== Cartography ==
The street is completely marked in the 14th edition from 1891, of the Brockhaus Enzyklopädie and also shown as built up to the Bergmannschule.

== Road access ==
The only direct connection of the Bergmannstraße to the public transport is the station Bergmannstraße of the bus line 53 (Münchner Freiheit – Aidenbachstraße), which runs through the Kazmairstraße, a crossroad of Bergmannstraße.

The nearest underground stations are located about 400 meters away, these are the stations Schwanthalerhöhe, as well as Heimeranplatz, the latter station is also connected to the Munich S-Bahn network.

== Historical Monuments ==
Directly on Bergmannstraße lie ten historical monuments built between 1889 and 1927, in the youth or Neo-Baroque style as well as in the style of New Objectivity. The Bergmannstraße crosses the Gollierplatz Ensemble (E-1-62-000-19). Nr. 56, 58, 62, 64 and 66 at the southwestern end of Bergmannstraße form a coherent, handsome but not exactly uniform group of buildings.

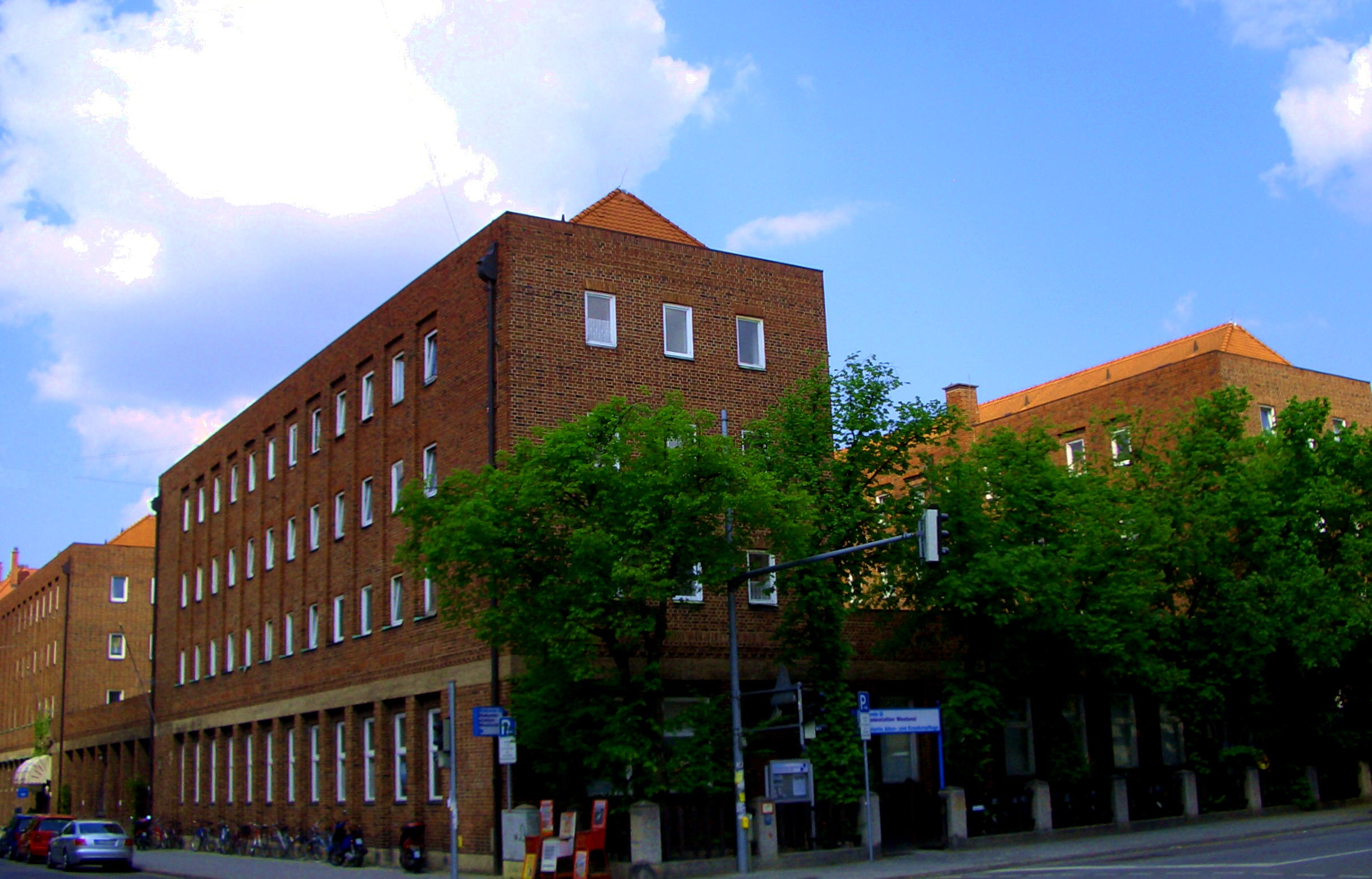
No. 35 Ledigenheim built by Theodor Fischer

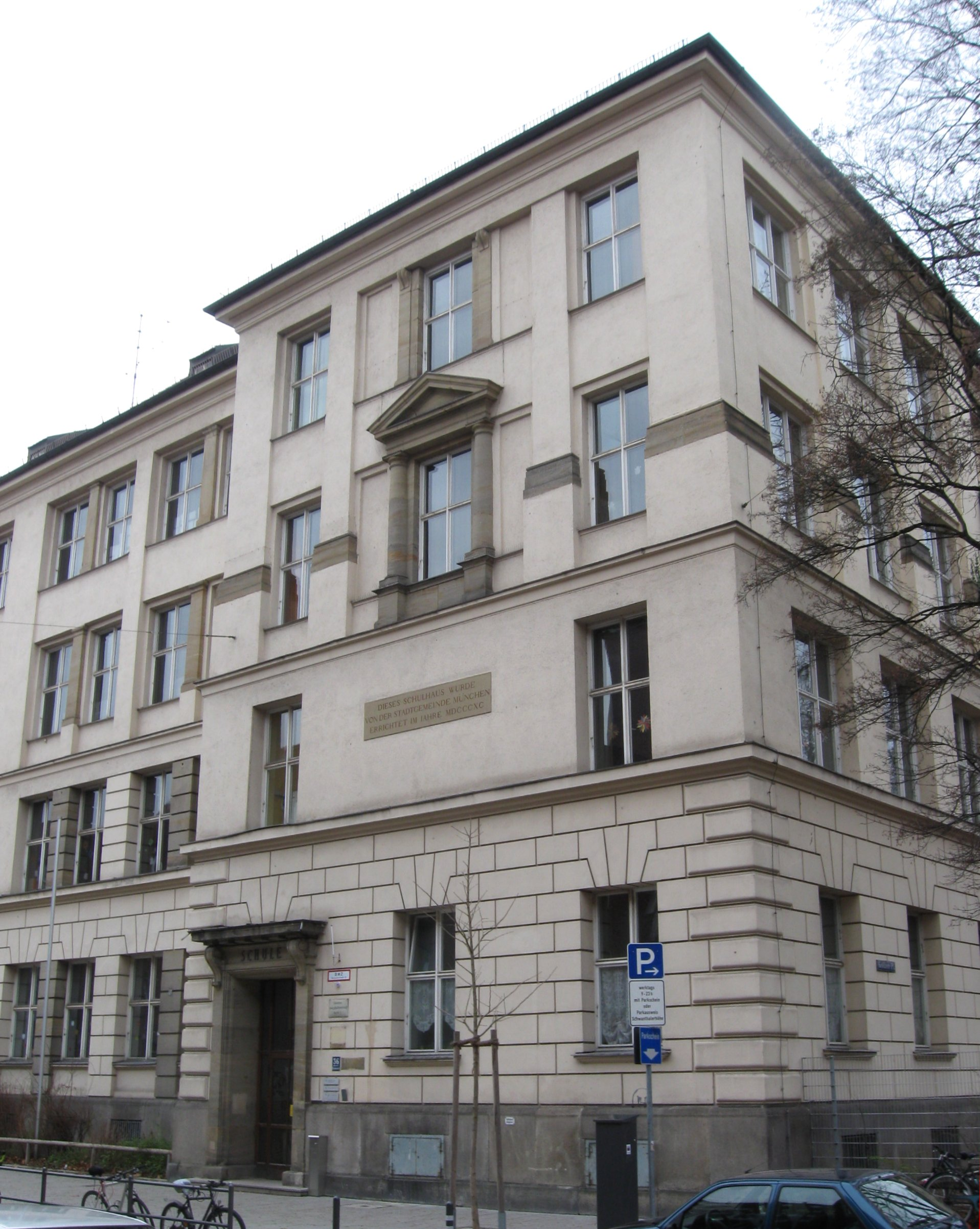
No. 36: Board school 1889/91 built by Friedrich Löwel und Carl Hocheder

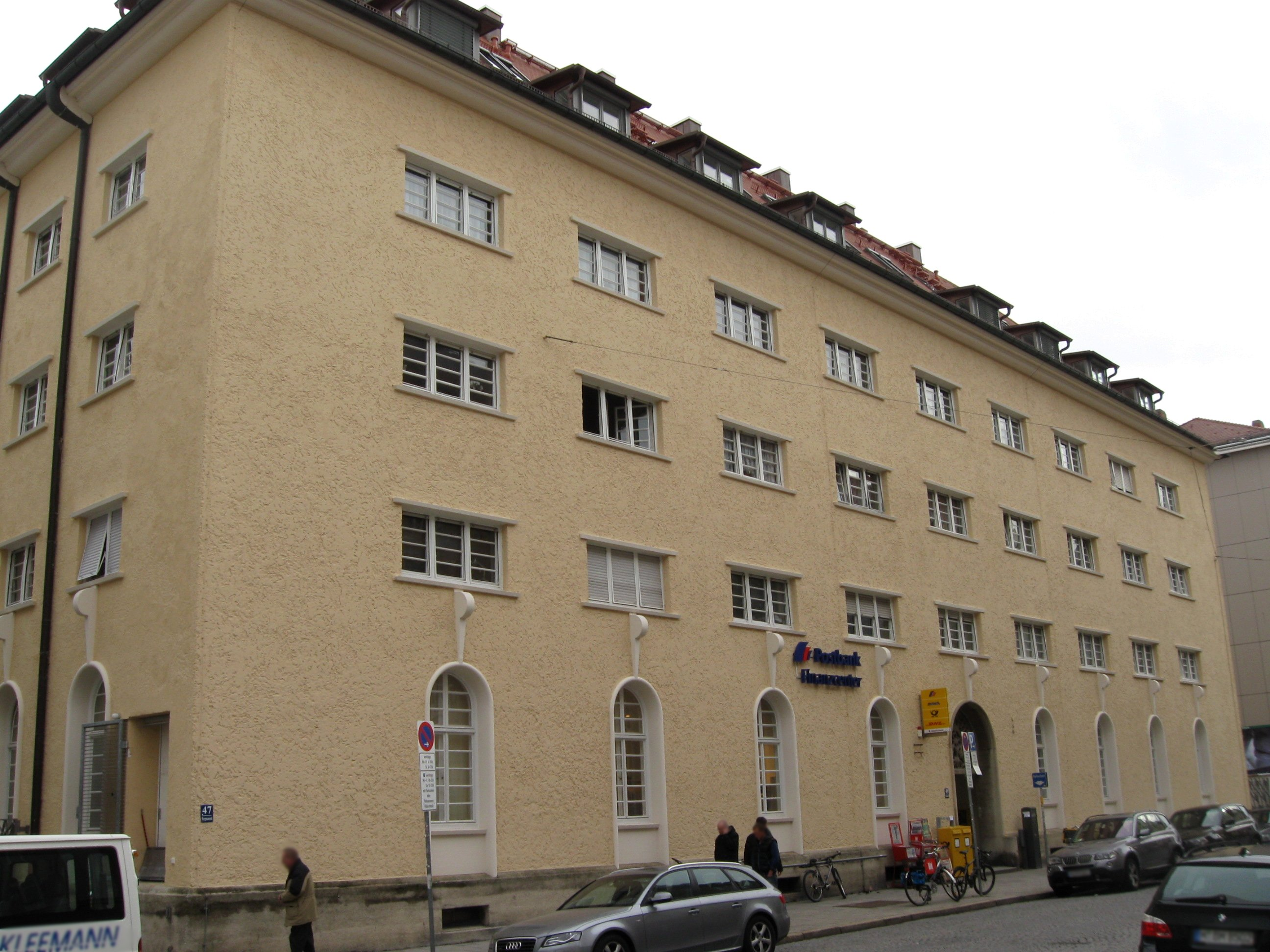
No. 47: Post office 1925/26 built by Franz Holzhammer, Robert Vorhoelzer, and Walther Schmidt

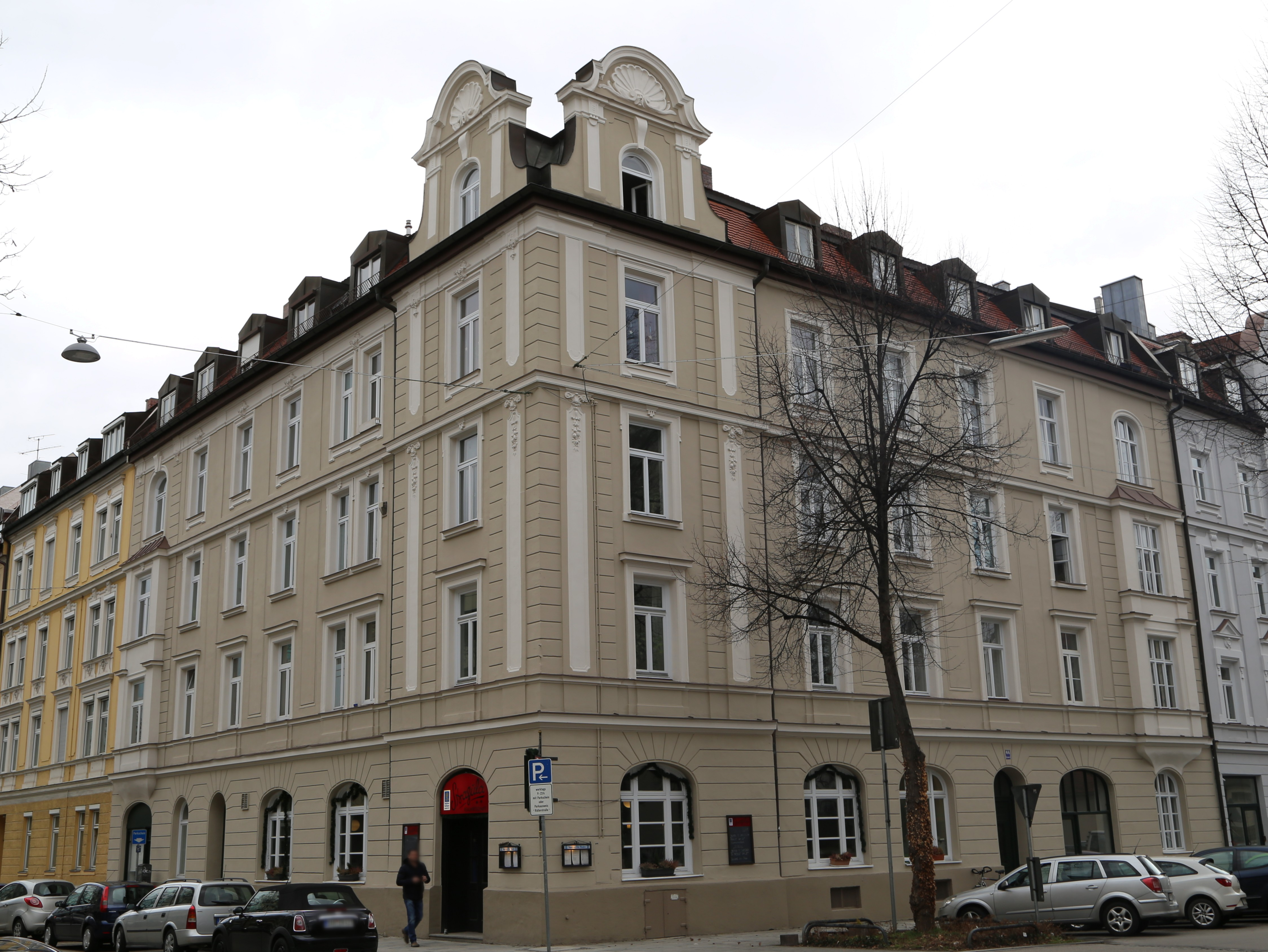
Nr. 66: 1898–99 built by Anton Wörz

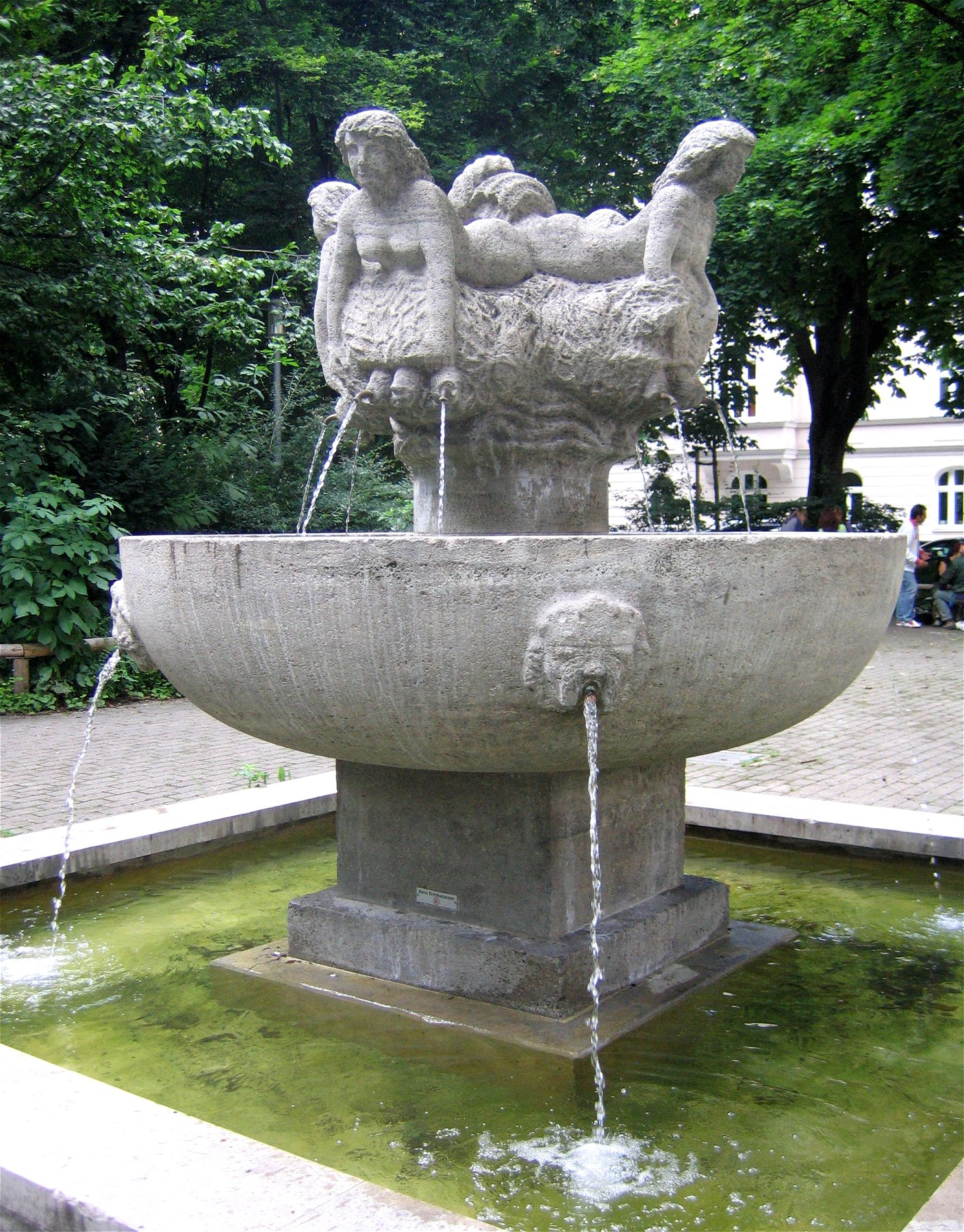
The Nymphenbrunnen at Gollierplatz

At Gollierplatz facing Bergmannstraße, is the so-called Nymphenbrunnen (Nymph fountain) of Elmar Dietz from the 1930s.

== Other notable houses ==
- In the house Bergmannstraße 35 is the Ledigenheim Munich, next to the Ledigenheim Hamburg Europe's last home of its kind.
- The Bergmannschule (Bergmannstraße 36):
  - At the time, Georg Kerschensteiner opened the first of his Munich auxiliary school classes in a barrack in the courtyard of the Bergmannschule. From autumn 1902, Rupert Egenberger taught children with different disabilities on his behalf.
  - The school was a barrack during World War II, housing four student companies. In the 2nd student company of medical students, members of the resistance group White Rose had to do their military service with Hans Scholl, Alexander Schmorell and Willi Graf.
  - The building was, from 22 January to 24 April 1945, an external or auxiliary camp of the Dachau concentration camp, in which male prisoners had to provide services.
- In the house Bergmannstraße 46 ("Greek House") is the Evangelical Migration Center in Munich.
- In the house Bergmannstraße 66 the cabaret Stragula is operated.
