= Tulbeckstraße =

Street in Munich, Germany

The Tulbeckstraße is a street in Munich and lies west of the city center in the district Schwanthalerhöhe. It leads from Parkstraße in the east to Trappentreustraße in the west. It was named after the Munich patrician family Tulbeck in 1878. From this family came the Freising Prince-Bishop Johann IV Tulbeck (term: 1453-1473).

== Location ==
The Tulbeckstraße is located in the district Schwanthalerhöhe and is lies in the Westend of the district. This is a classic working-class district with cooperative buildings from around 1900. The Tulbeckstraße is centrally located in the district and runs in the west–east direction over a length of more than 700 meters. The northern parallel road is the Schwanthalerstraße and the Westendstraße, the southern parallel road is the Gollierstraße with the Gollierplatz.

== Route ==
The Tulbeckstraße branches off to the east from Parkstraße and unlike the Gollierstraße, has no connection to the Theresienhöhe. It flows into the west at the height of the Trappentreutunnel on the Trappentreustraße.

The Tulbeckstraße is dominated by rental houses, which are numbered from east to west from 1 to 57 and 2 to 52. The eastern of the street, the rental houses are dominated by a Neo-Renaissance style (1882–1889) and in the West mainly by German Renaissance and Art Nouveau style (1901–1924).

== History ==
In 1862, the Drexler barrel factory settled on the site and held the address of Westendstraße 95. A road formed at its southern end, named Tulbeckstraße since 1878, and was gradually built from east to west.

== Cartography ==
The street is completely depicted in the 14th edition, from 1891, of the Brockhaus Konversations-Lexikon and already shown to be built past the Bergmannstraße.

== Road access ==
There is no direct connection of Tulbeckstraße to public transportation. The nearest underground stations are Schwanthalerhöhe and Heimeranplatz. The Heimeranplatz station is connected to the S-Bahn network next to the nearby Munich Donnersbergerbrücke station. The bus line 134/53 can be reached via the Schwanthalerhöhe stop, the 133/53 bus line via the Gollierplatz stop and the tram line 18/19 via the Schrenkstraße stop.

== Historical buildings ==
Between 1880 and 1890, four-storey apartment buildings of medium to low standard were built along Tulbeckstraße. These had open courtyards and low surrounding buildings, which were mostly occupied by commercial businesses. These buildings include, among others, the five houses built by the Catholic Workers 'Association Munich-West, founded in 1888, in Ganghofer- / Tulbeckstraße as a workers' home. In 1911/12, the housing complexes were built with the house numbers 41 to 51, which had been commissioned by the construction cooperative Munich-West. Since the late 1970s, the Tulbeckstraße was extensively integrated into the urban renewal of the Westend.

A total of 23 built historical buildings between 1882 and 1924, are located directly on the Tulbeckstraße, and mainly in the style of the Neo-Renaissance, German Renaissance and Art Nouveau.

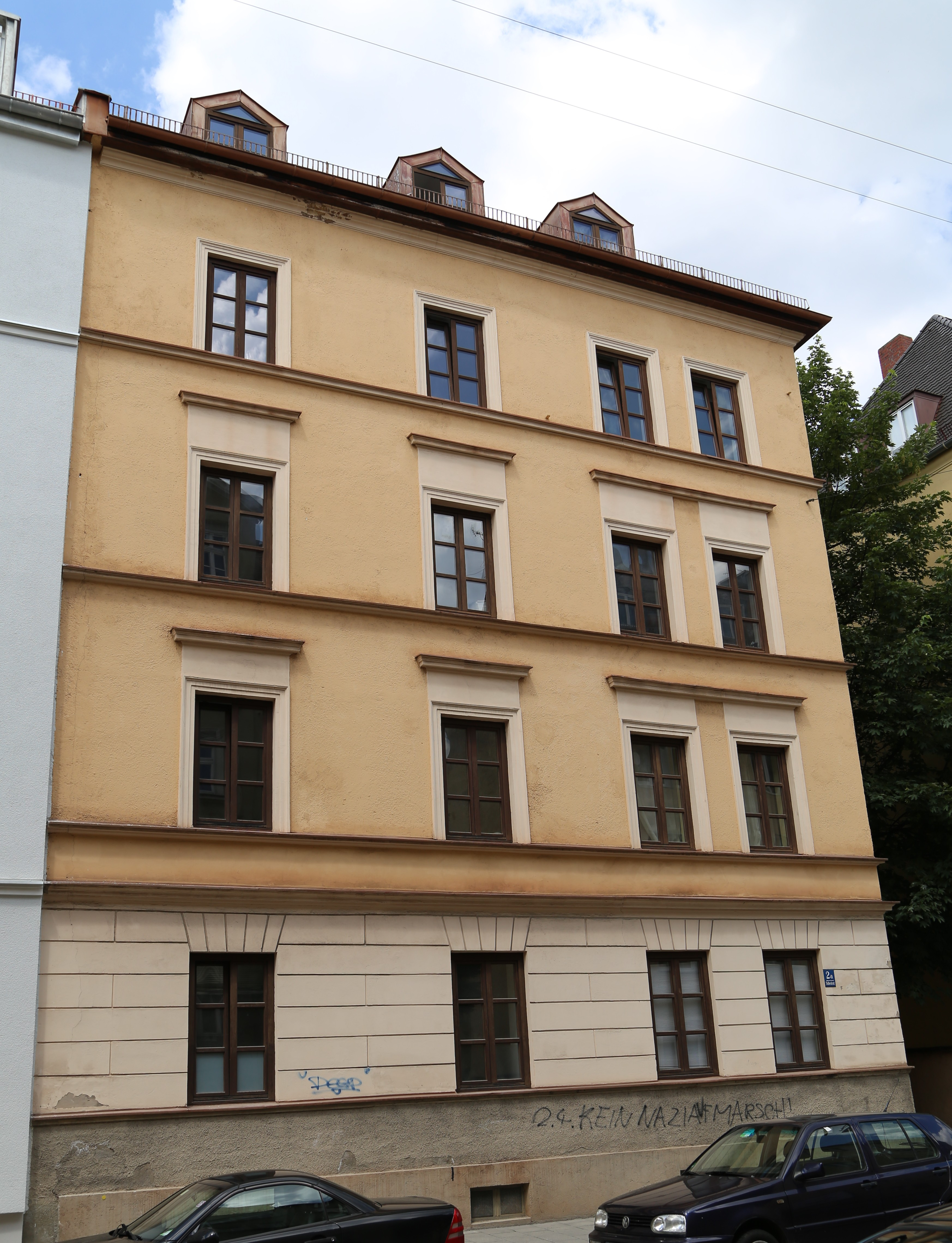
Tulbeckstraße 2a, late classicist tradition (1884)

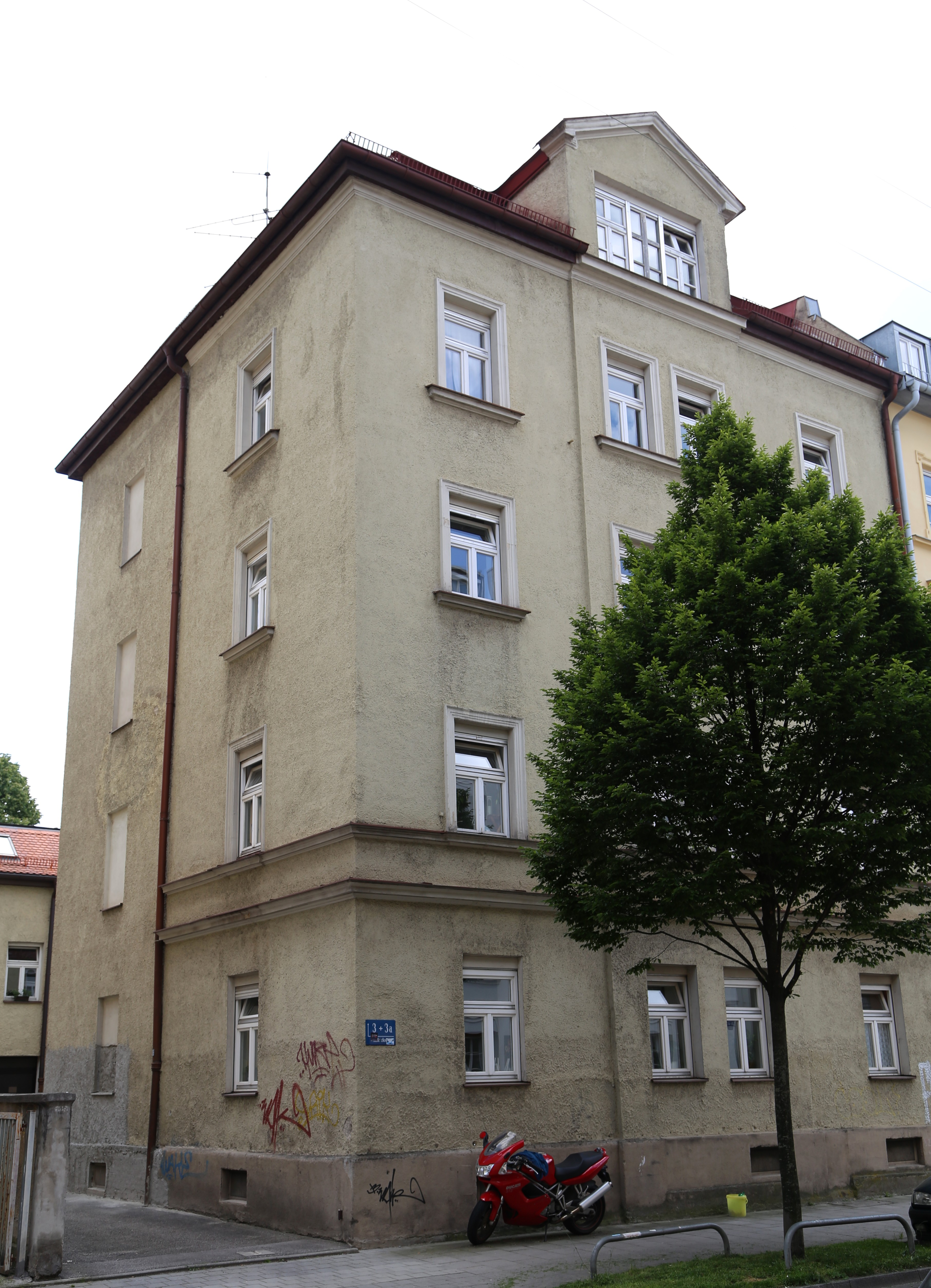
Tulbeckstraße 3, 1882

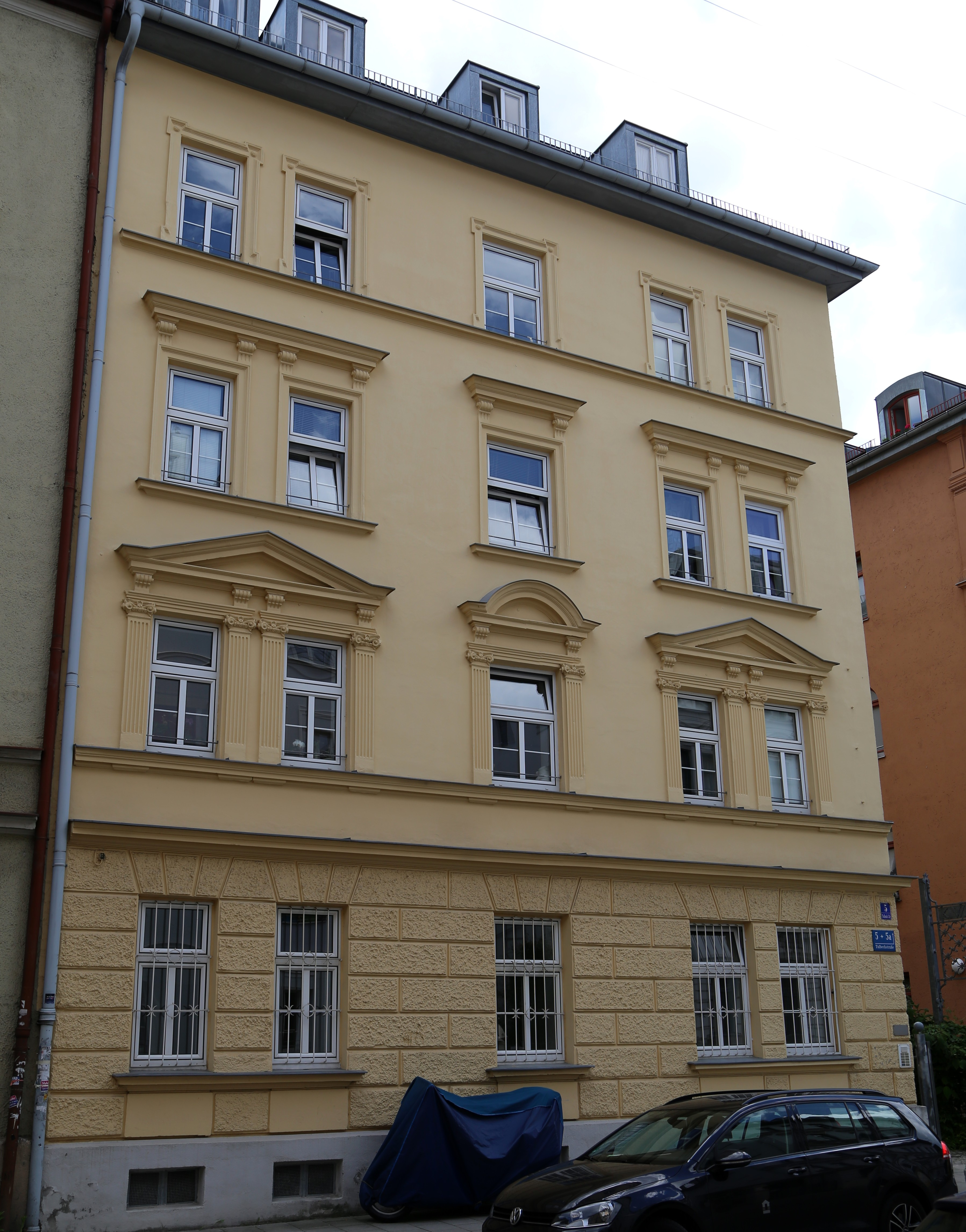
Tulbeckstraße 5, late classicist tradition (1887/88)

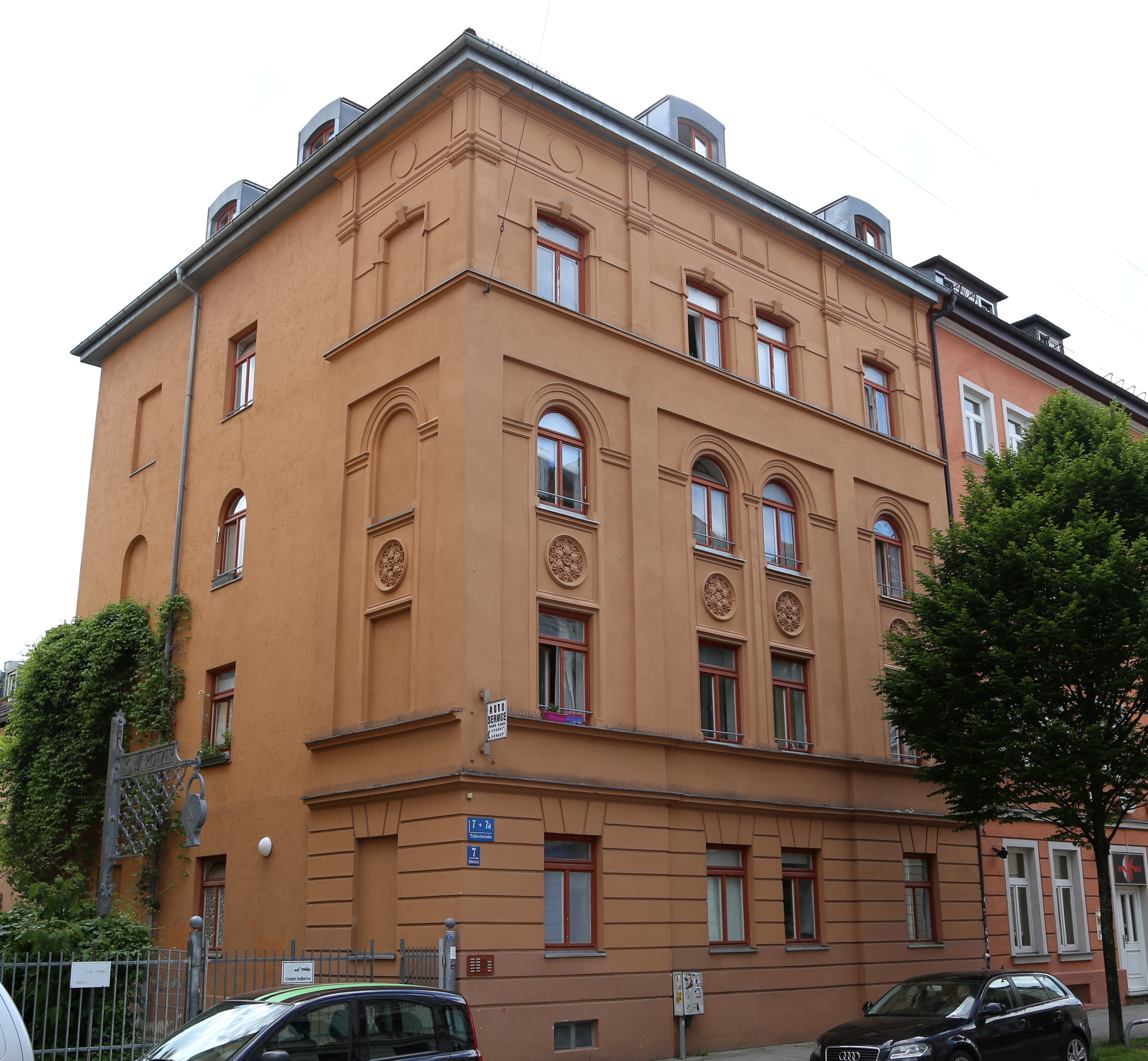
Tulbeckstraße 7, late classicist tradition (1884)

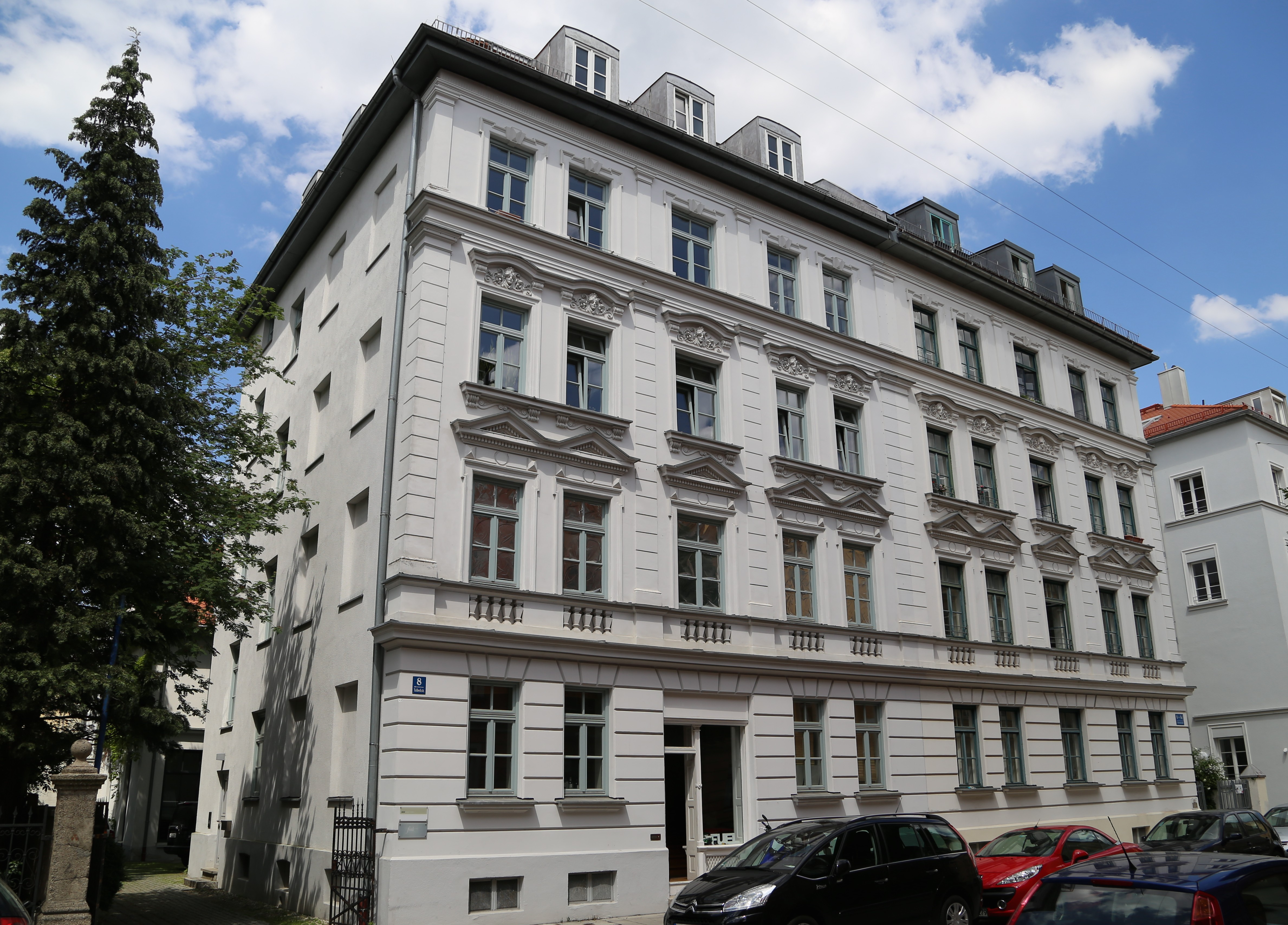
Tulbeckstraße 8, late classicist tradition (1886)

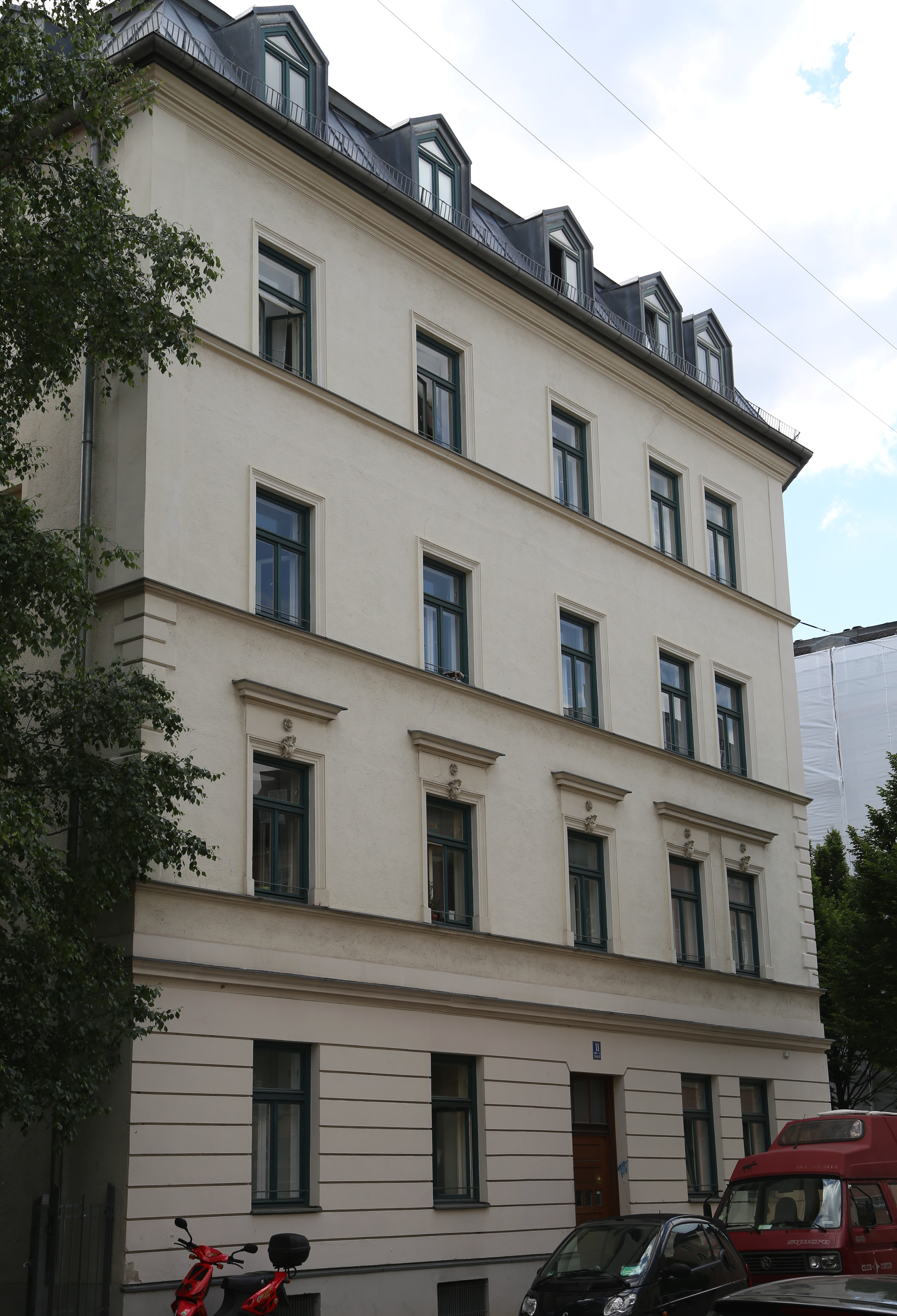
Tulbeckstraße 11, late classicist tradition (1886)

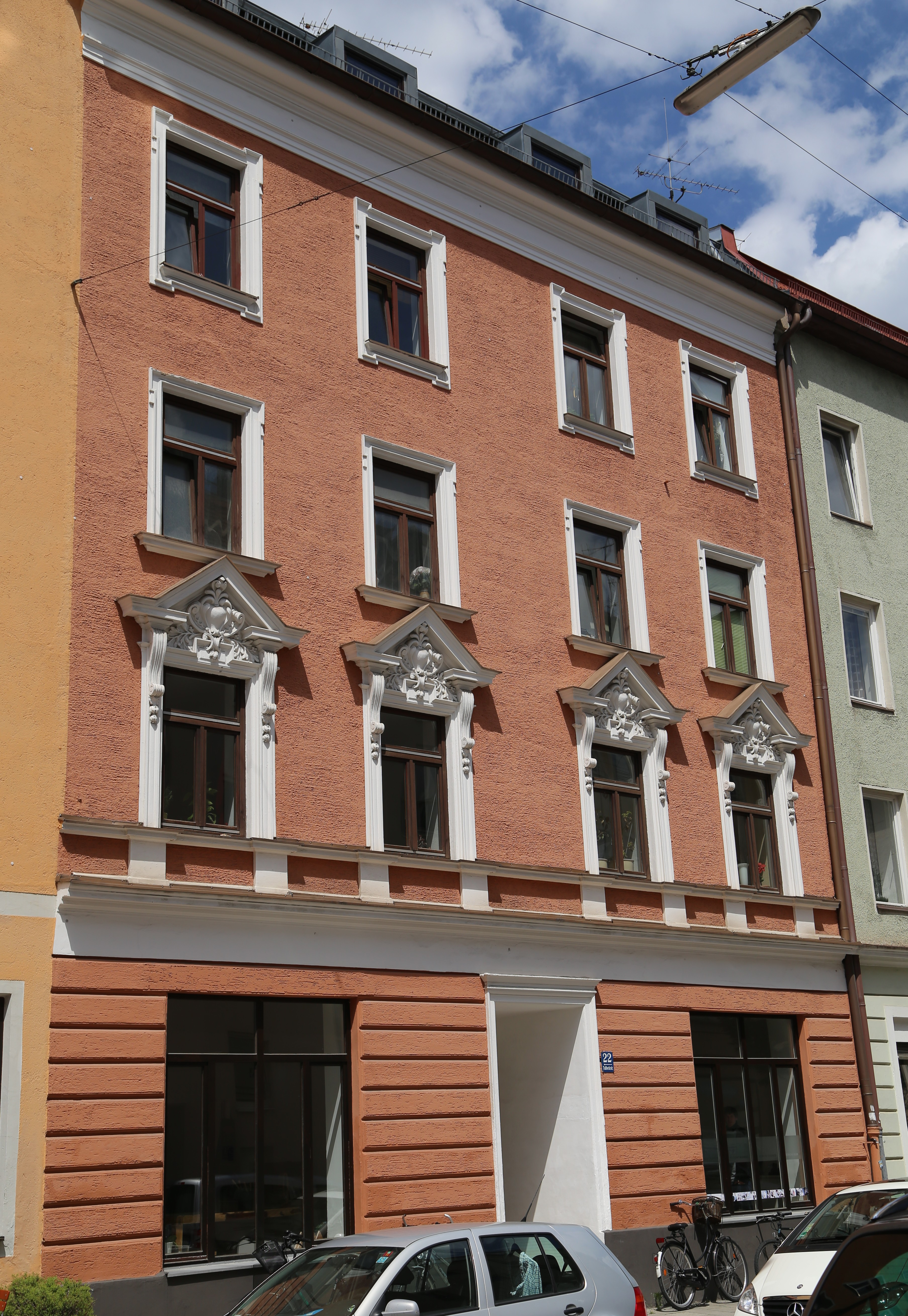
Tulbeckstraße 22, late classicist tradition (1889)

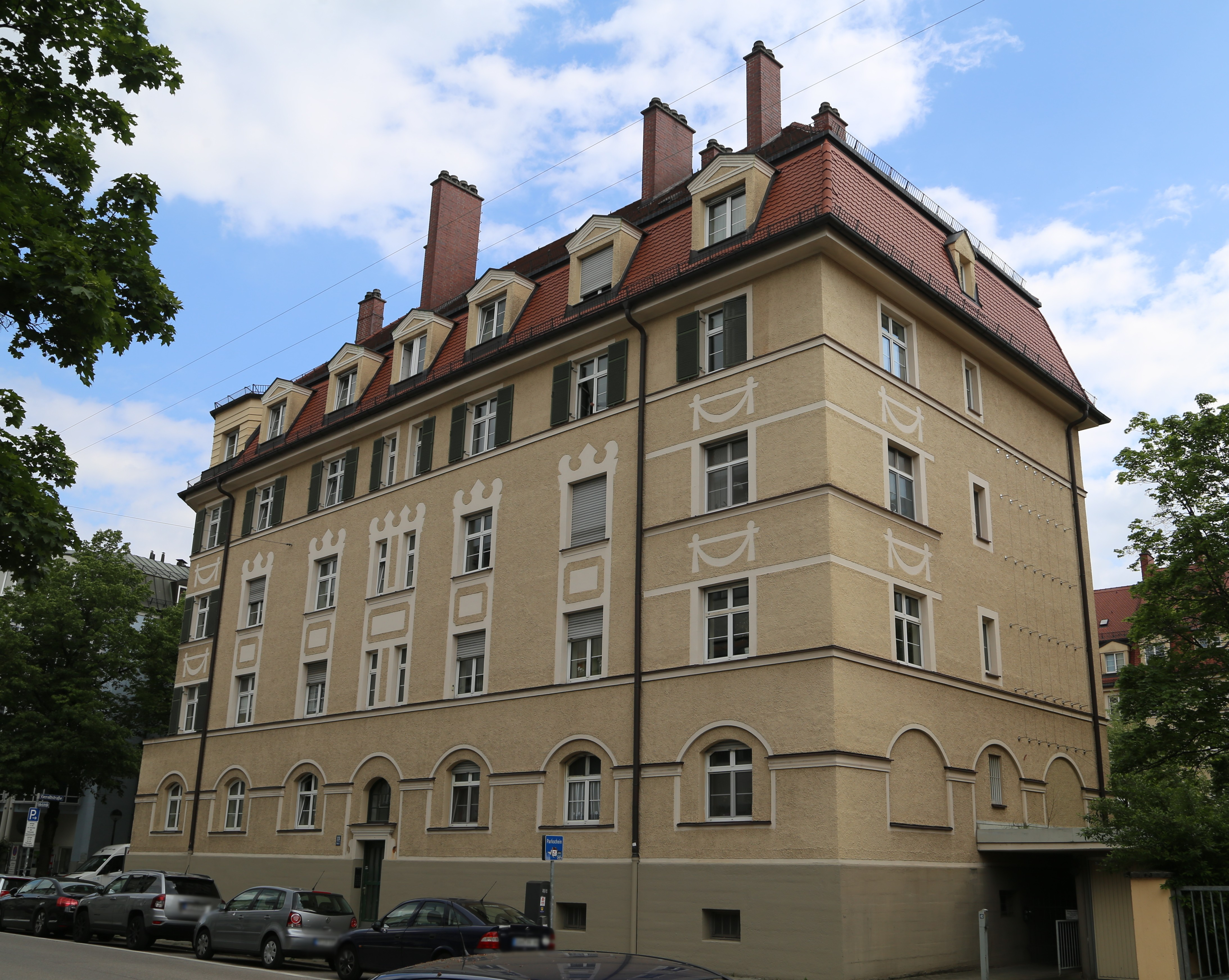
Tulbeckstraße 33, baroque (1920–22), part of Gollierstraße 54/56/56a and b

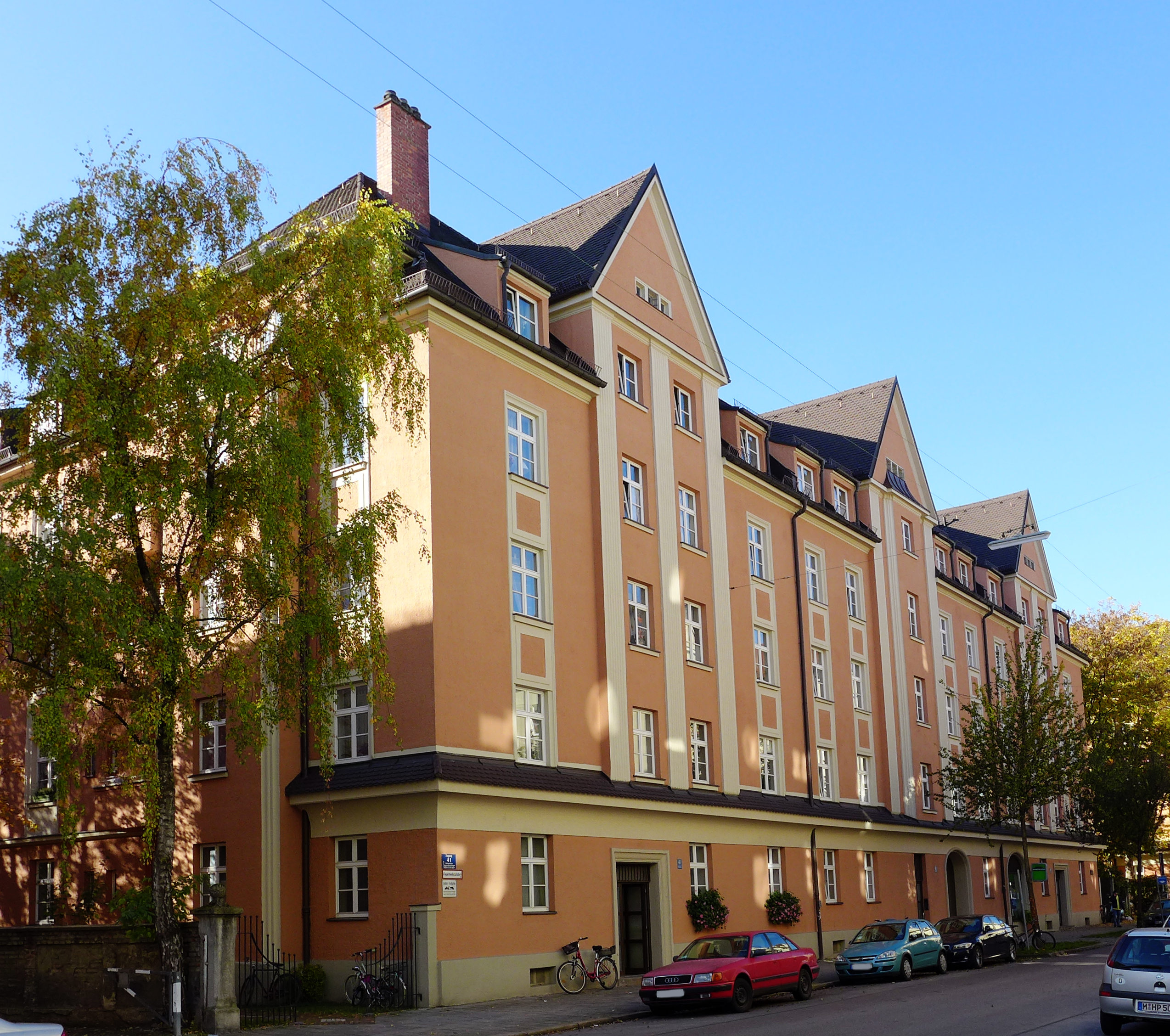
Tulbeckstraße 41, 43, 45, 47, 49, 51, later art nouveau (1911)

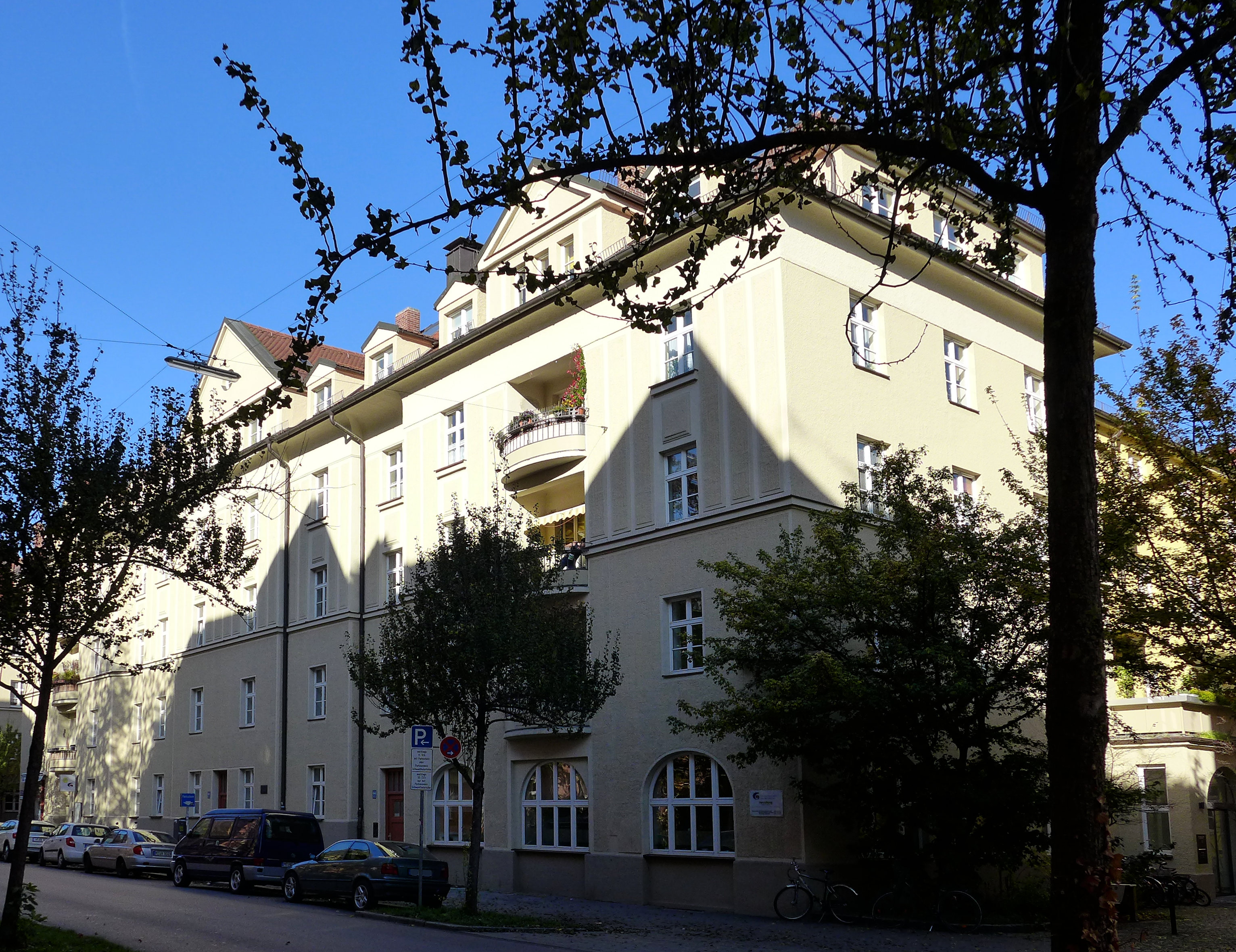
Tulbeckstraße 42, 44, 46, 48, 50, 52, historicizing (1910-11 und 1924)

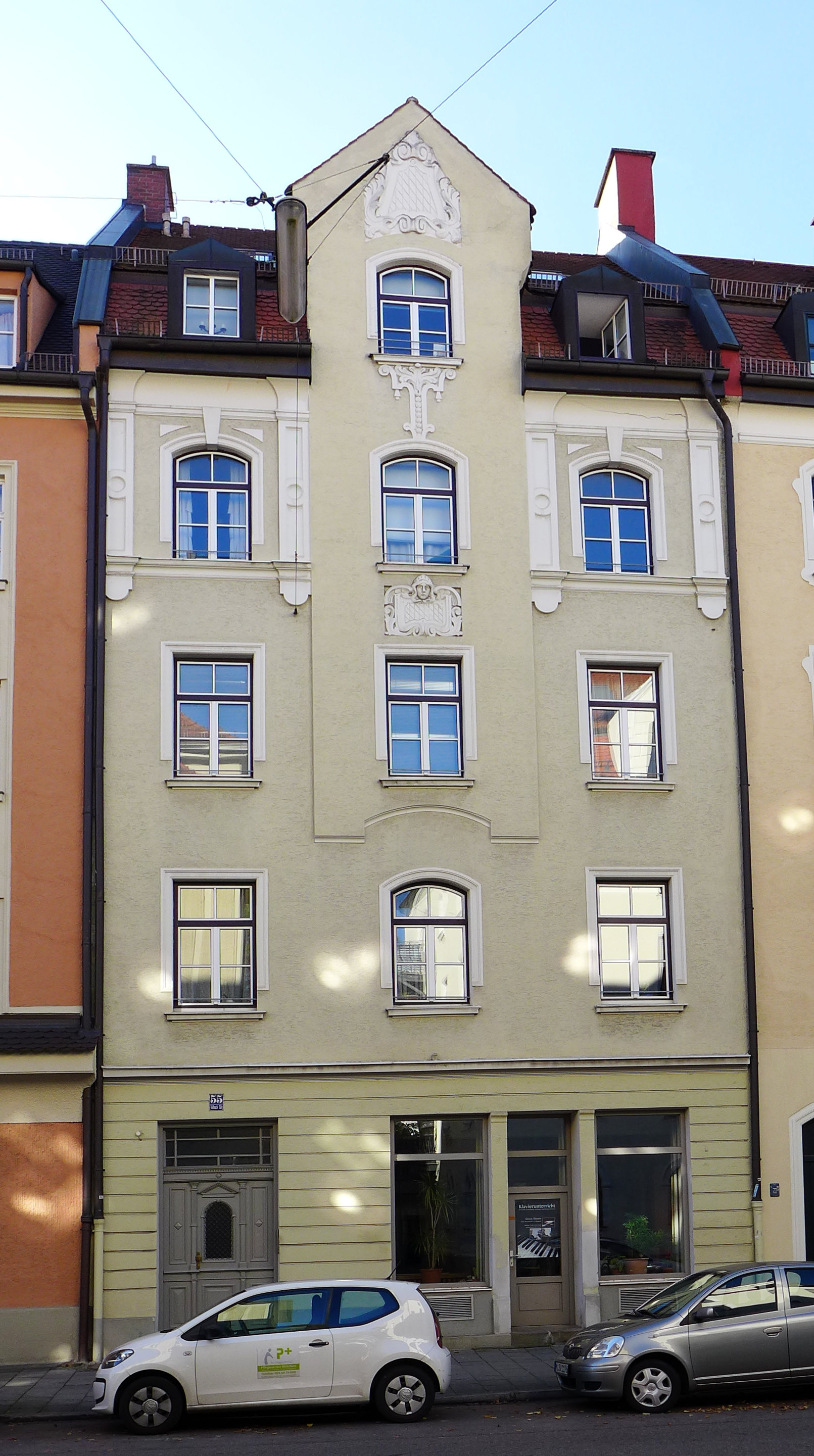
Tulbeckstraße 55, German renaissance with art nouveau decor (1902)

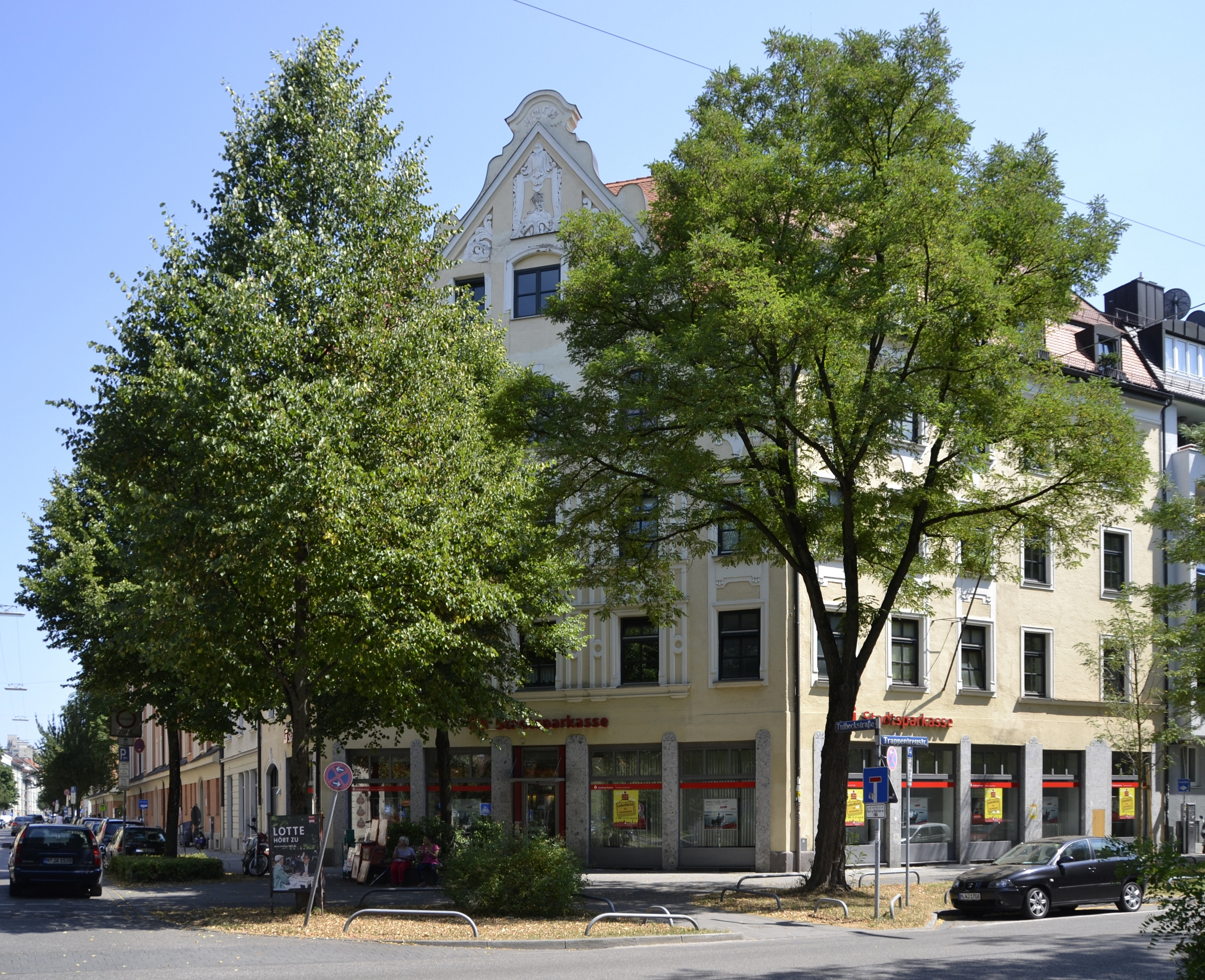
Tulbeckstraße 57, German renaissance with art nouveau decor (1901)

Apartment buildings of Kastulus Binderberger (2a), Georg Schillinger (3), Johann Grimm (5), Franz Buchold (6, 8), Karl Albert (7), Heinrich Hermann (11), Georg Müller (22), Ludwig Naneder (33), Jakob Heilmann und Max Littmann (41, 42, 43, 44, 45, 46, 47, 48, 49, 50, 51) und Leonhard Moll (52)

== Other notable houses ==
- Tulbeckstraße 4: this building is the home of the publishing house "The Free Book" and the associated printing house, also the "publishing house for the promotion of the scientific point of view - Stephan Eggerdinger publishing house", as well as numerous left-wing groups (i.e. August-Kühn Association, workers' federation for the reconstruction of the KPD, association for the advancement of the scientific point of view eV)

The house is also known as the "House with the Red Flag" and since the early 1970s, has been considered the center of the workers' culture and the Munich labor movement. It is currently represented in the Munich media due to an eviction action brought upon by the city.

- Tulbeckstraße 12: This address was used as a dormitory for illegal migrant workers in the 1970s, "known as from Istanbul to Pakistan".
- Tulbeckstraße 19: The building houses the "Kinderhaus Lummerland e. V. ".

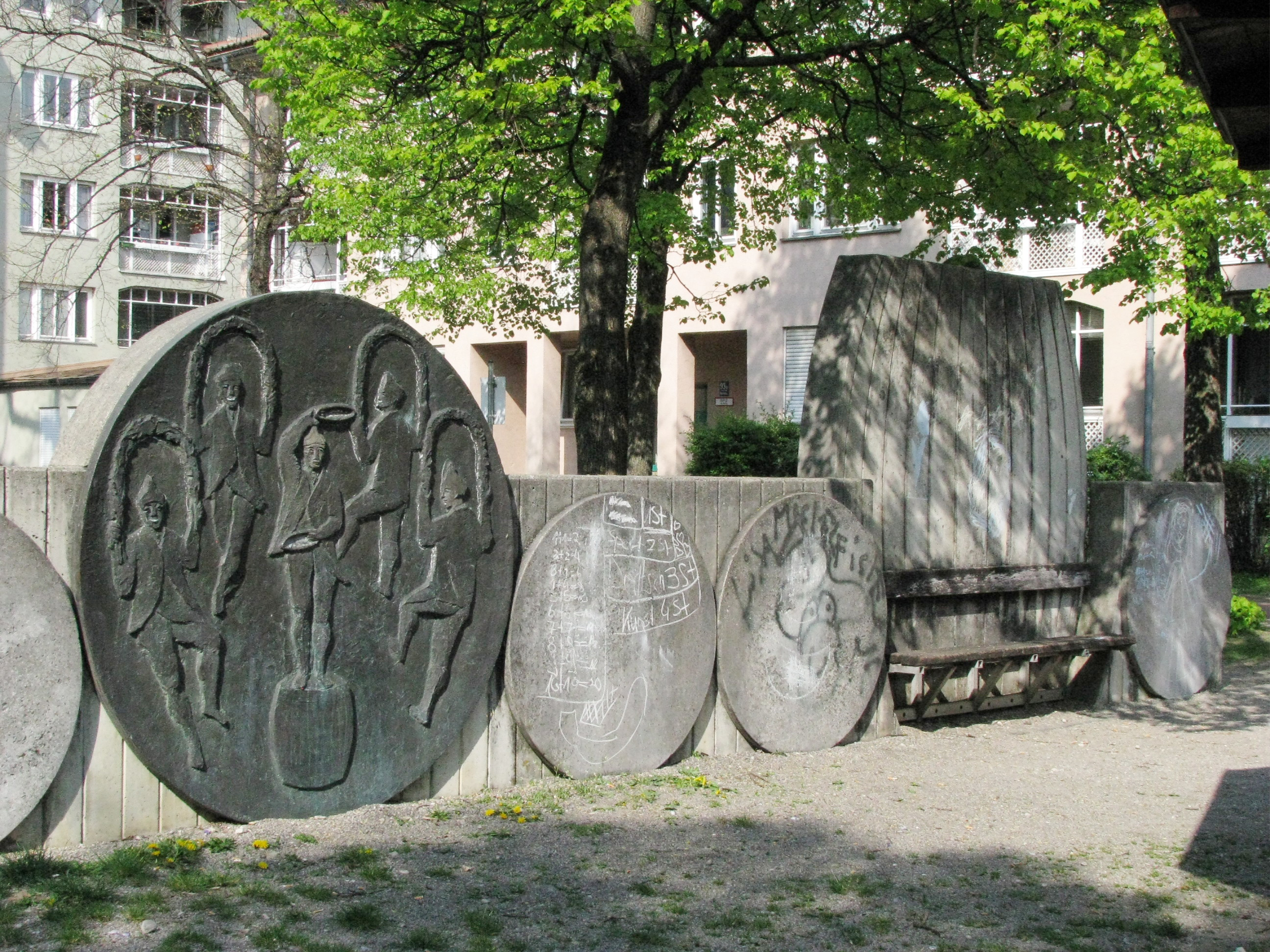
Memorial in memory of the barrel factory Drexler

- Tulbeckstraße 26/28: In the courtyard of Tulbeckstraße 26 to 28 there is a monument in memory of the barrel factory Drexler. The "Mechanical barrel Factory Joh. Drexler & Sohn" (1862-1979) was demolished in the course of urban renewal. In its place, the City of Munich 1985/86 built 191 apartments through the Munich Society for Urban Renewal and Gewofag.
- Tulbeckstraße 27 (/ 29): The Catholic Workers' Association Munich-West, founded in 1888, erected the so-called "Arbeiterheim" on Ganghoferstraße / Tulbeckstraße, later called "Rupertusheim“. The building on Tulbeckstraße housed a large festival and theater hall from 1896, which served as a venue until the early 1980s for- among others - the "Dramatic Club Alpenröserl e. V. ", the" Dramatic Club Munich West "and the" Munich Caritas Stage ". From 1952, the Carlton Film Company moved, under the direction of Günther Stapenhorst, into the former Rupertusheim and converted the residential house with restaurant into a studio with three recording halls and a total area of 1400 m². There, numerous famous feature films were filmed, for example, The White Horse Inn (1952 film), The Flying Classroom (1954 film), King Rollers (1955 film) and Little Man - very big (1957). The company was handed over to the tv star Produktions- and Ateliergesellschaft mbH and the Lisa Film GmbH (for example, Our Doctor is the Best, 1969). In addition, the Tulbeckstraße 27, until the expropriation by the National Socialists in 1938, housed the renowned Munich Enzianbrennerei & liqueur factory L. Eberhardt, which was founded in 1879.
- Tulbeckstraße 31: In this building on the corner of Geroltstraße, is home to the elderly center and service center since 1983. The center is also the home of the "Diakoniestation Westend of the Evangelical Society of Munich Westend e.V." and the rehearsal location of the Bürger-Sänger-Zunft München e. V.
- Tulbeckstraße 42 to 50: The residential complex was built in 1910/1911 on behalf of the "Baugenossenschaft München-West". The Tulbeckstraße 44 also served as a restaurant "Genossenschaftsheim", where for many years, the local group of the "Arbeiter-Radfahrerbund solidarity" met. In the 1980s, the „Genossenschaftsheim“ became the left alternative pub "Beim Knittel". Since 1991, the administrative headquarters of the "Wohnungsgenossenschaft München-West eG" have been located in the premises. The "Association generation-friendly living with the housing cooperative München-West e. V. " has its home on the ground floor of the Tulbeckstraße 48.
- Tulbeckstraße 57: In this building is a branch of the Stadtsparkasse München.
