= Gollierplatz =

Public square in Munich, Germany

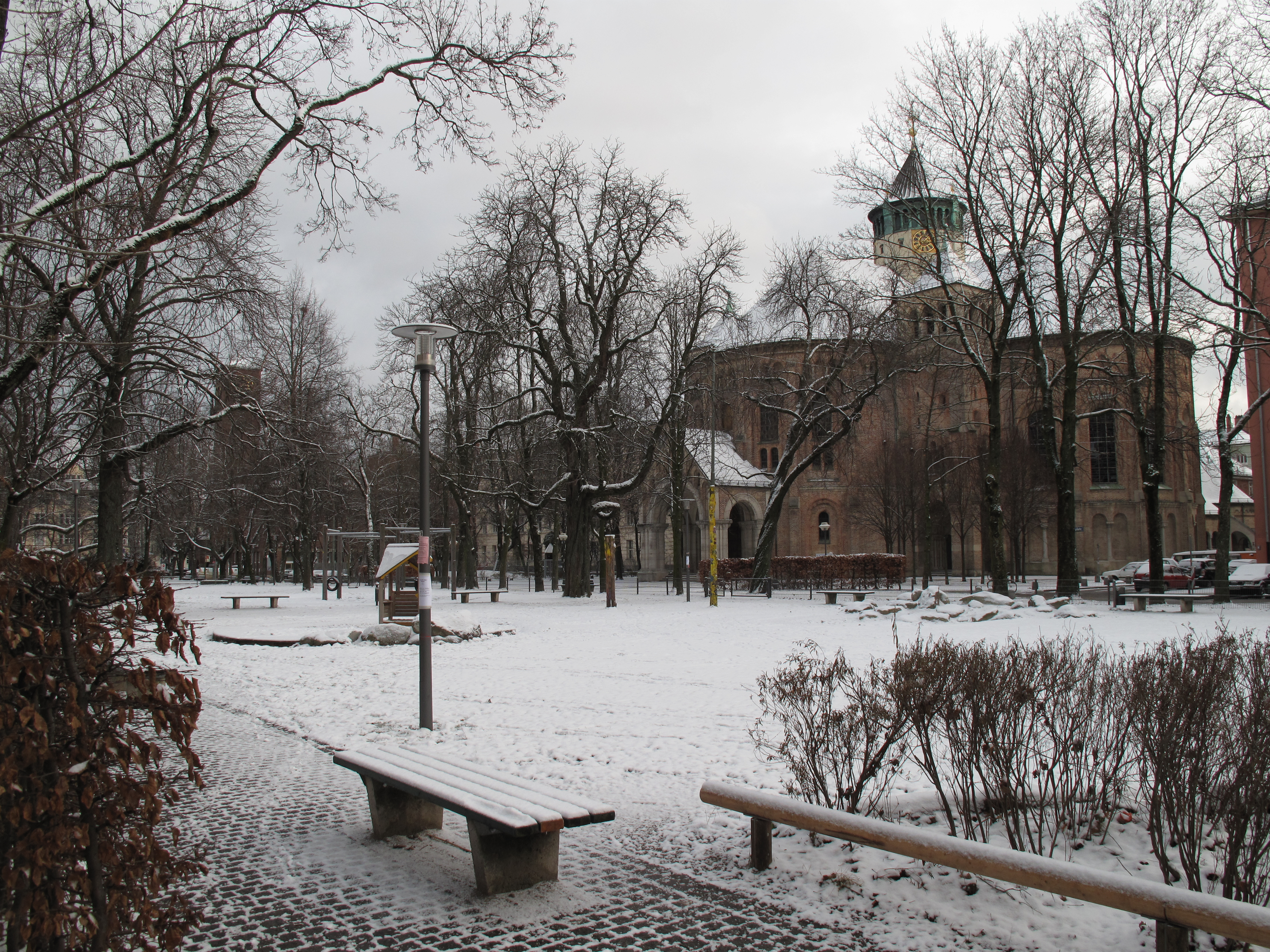
Gollierplatz with St. Rupert in the background

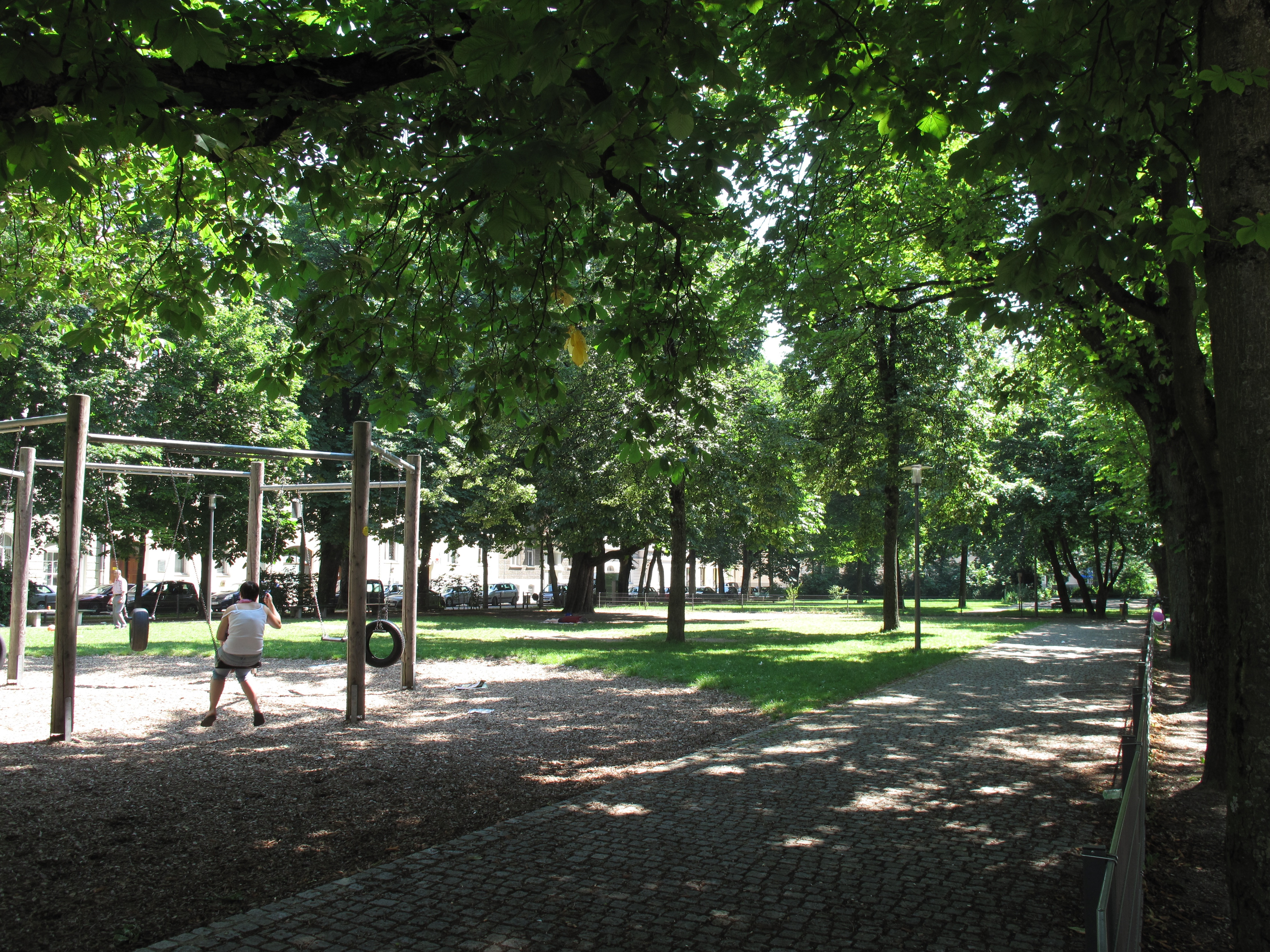
Gollierplatz (eastern half)

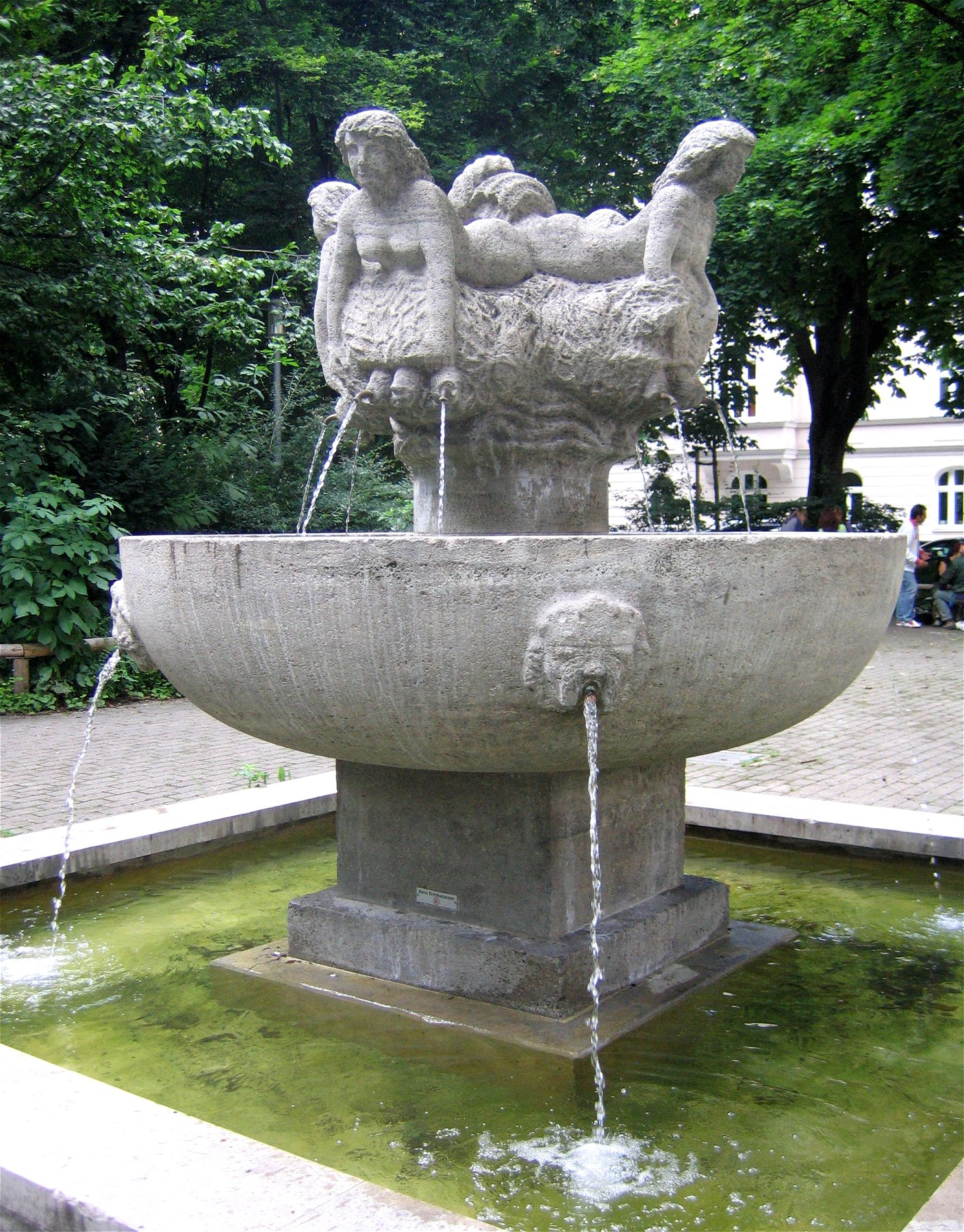
Vier-Nymphen-Brunnen at the east side of the Gollierplatz

The Gollierplatz is a square in Munich's Westend district. Surrounded by historically listed buildings, the square is a pleasant green space containing children's play equipment, a permanent table tennis table, and a fountain. The Vier-Nymphen-Brunnen (Four Nymphs Fountain ) by Elmar Dietz has been located in the eastern part of the square since 1938.

== Location ==
The Gollierplatz extends in an east-west direction between Trappentreustraße and Bergmannstraße on an area of approx. 10,000 m^{2}.

== History ==
Since 1897, the square has borne the name of a Munich patrician family, presumably extinct since 1318.

Located in the heart of the Westend residential district, Gollierplatz is a prominent example of Munich urban planning around 1900. Originally planned as a regular geometric element in net-like alignment, the square and its surroundings were redesigned in 1892 following a city expansion competition. The south side in particular was loosened up and provided with views in the direction of Kiliansplatz. Due to the later development of closed, monumental residential complexes, the square once again developed in a different direction and it was transformed from picturesque into a strict practicality.

One of the first buildings in the squares south side was the two-wing school built by Carl Hocheder between 1889 and 1891. From 1901 to 1903, Gabriel von Seidl built the parish church of St. Rupert to the west of the school building in a neo-Romanesque style. It was not until 1926 that Ludwig Naneder added the parsonage with its hipped roof. In 1902 the striking corner house Kiliansplatz 6 with two staggered gables and a corner oriel in Neo-Renaissance style was built. At the beginning of the 20th century, several apartment buildings in late Art Nouveau style followed on the north side of Gollierplatz.

After the end of the First World War, the northern side of the square between Ganghoferstraße, Geroltstraße and Bergmannstraße to Naneder was closed off with several monumental apartment blocks. Even larger residential complexes with inner courtyards were built on the south side between Gollierstraße, Kazmairstraße, Geroltstraße and Ganghoferstraße in the 1920s style. From 1925 to 1927, Theodor Fischer's Ledigenheim (home for single people), one of Munich's most important buildings in the early New Objectivity style, built in brick construction to the southeast. From 1930 to 1931, German Bestelmeyer oriented his Protestant-Lutheran Church of the Resurrection and the associated vicarage towards the Fischersche Ledigenheim.

The Vier-Nymphen-Brunnen (Four Nymphs Fountain ) by Elmar Dietz has been located on the eastern part of the square since 1938.

The individual buildings of the square are historically listed, the square is registered as an ensemble of buildings.
