= Donnersbergerstraße =

Street in Munich, Germany

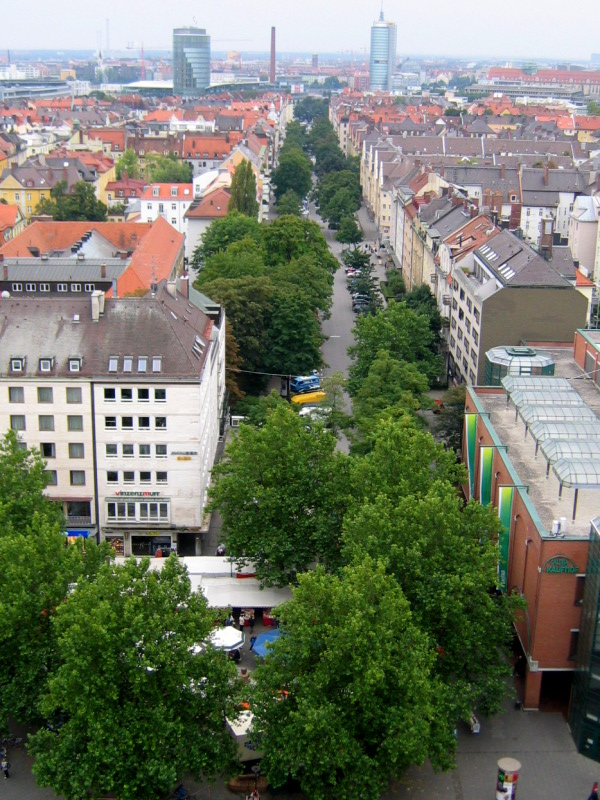
Donnersbergerstraße from north to south

The Donnersbergerstraße (often written incorrectly as Donnersberger Straße) is a street in the Munich district Neuhausen, in the city district of Neuhausen-Nymphenburg. It connects the Rotkreuzplatz with the Arnulfstraße in the north-south direction. It is named after the Privy Councilor and Supreme Chancellor of the Bavarian elector Maximilian I, Joachim Freiherr von Donnersberg (1561–1650), who came from the Munich patrician family, Donnersberger.

== History ==
Originally, the road was called Sendlinger Weg or Kirchweg, because Neuhausen was not a parish in its own right and the services were held in Sendling until 1871. This road went along the today's Donnersbergerstraße, led slightly to the east at the height of the present Richelstraße, crossing the railway tracks at Maillingerstraße, went over into Bergmannstraße and continued to the old Sendlinger church. On 1 June, 1877, the municipality of Neuhaus changed the streets name to Uhlmannstraße, after the hop-merchant Jakob Uhlmann (1829–1895) from Fürth, who owned the properties there and had made the trail into a road. It was not a cobblestone street, but a fortified country road. Uhlmann also owned houses and buildings in the Nymphenburger and Schulstraße. After the incorporation of Neuhausen to Munich, the renaming of Donnersbergerstraße took place, and was effective from 1 January 1895. In 1896 a new alley with 200 maple trees was planted, the former alley with Kugelakazien was excavated and used again in the eastern cemetery. Looking at the structural development of the road, it is noticeable that the construction hesitantly began around 1875 only on the eastern side of the road. On the western side only the workers' houses bordered the Donnersbergerstraße from 1893, the third construction section between Hirschberg and Schluderstrasse.

The large building boom started at the beginning of the 20th century. In addition to the numerous private or pensioner homes, the railway cooperatives on the west side erected their large housing units. Until the year 1908, Donnersbergerstraße was not paved. The house owners were obliged to spray the road with water when the weather was dry.

The first suburban public transportation that passed through Donnersbergerstraße was the Omni bus line number 31, which led from the Wholesale Market Munich to the Rotkreuzplatz. However, it was in operation for only two months, from January to March 1913, and then stopped because of its unprofitable nature. From 1920 to 1970, the tram line 22 from Nikolaiplatz to Harras, went through Donnersbergerstraße and over the bridge carrying the same name.

During the air raids in the Second World War, the northern part of the road was severely affected; the southern part of the road was spared. Until the completion of the new Donnersberger bridge in the 1972 Olympic year, Donnersbergerstraße was part of the Mittlerer Ring, which resulted in the removal of almost all of the front gardens.

== Neuhauser Reeperbahn ==
Because of its unusually high density of restaurants, the Donnersbergerstraße was once a regular pleasure mile. In the year 1913, the 800 meters between Rotkreuzplatz and Donnersbergerbrücke was filled with no less than 16 localities. These were simply simple workers' economies, the clientele of which consisted almost exclusively of the inhabitants of Donnersbergerstraße and their side streets. During the inflation years 1920-24, eight localities were closed. In 1923 the "Tanz- und Konzertlokal Kolibri" was built in the Centralhalle on Donnersbergerstraße 42. The peak time at the Kolibri came in the 1950s. It became a well-known meeting place for the youth, since well-known bands from the Munich rock 'n' roll scene played there. Later, Faschingsprinz and longtime Hofmarschall of the Narrhalla, Vittorio Casagrande, played there with his band, the Rivieras. Up until the beginning of the 1960s, top bands performed at the Kolibri. The history workshop Neuhausen e.V. therefore gave the Donnersbergerstraße, at this time, the name Neuhauser Reeperbahn. In 1964 the Kolibri was closed down, and up until the year 2004, the Tengelmann branch operated in the premises. Today, after renovations, a doctor's office is located there.

== Development after 1970 ==
After completion of the Donnersberger bridge in 1972 and the streets new route along the Mittlerer Ringes through the Landshuter Allee, Donnersbergerstraße lost importance. The numerous dance halls had been closed and lack of investment activity left the building fabric, consisting of numerous old buildings protected as historical monuments, to deteriorate. For this reason, the district around Donnersbergerstraße became a cheap and yet central Munich residential area for a long time.

In the 1980s, renovation work was carried out by the city of Munich on Donnersbergerstraße. In the course of this, the northern part from Wilderich-Lang-Strasse was also redesigned from 1981 to 1982. The pavement was restored up to residential streets, the sidewalks were widened and numerous ally trees were planted. Only the southern part between Wilderich-Lang- and Arnulfstraße remained in the original condition for the time being, where until the year 2003, the remains of the former tram tracks could be seen.

In the spring of 2004, the reconstruction of the southern part of the road was started. In order to meet the general lack of parking space in the district, the City Council of Munich decided, after years of conceptual research, for an unprecedented solution: fully automatic parking garage under the street. In June 2006, the resident parking garage Donnersbergerstraße was finally put into operation with a total of 284 parking spaces. Investments totaled € 11 million and were partially financed through the Munich Aboveground parking lot fees.

== The road today ==
=== A district in transformation ===
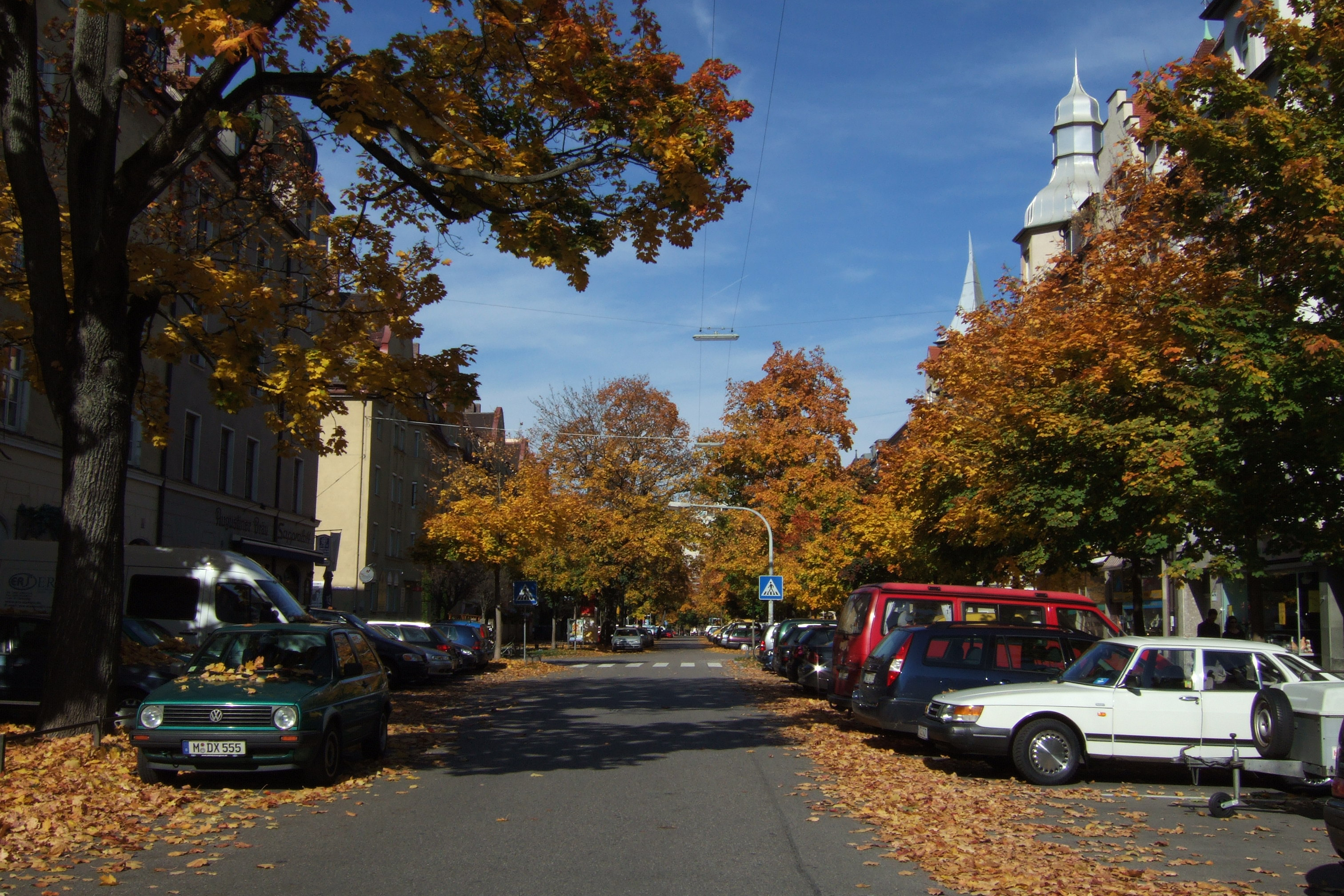
Autumn mood in Donnersbergerstraße (view to the north)

The reconstruction of the Donnersbergerstraße ended with the completion of the residents parking garage and the restoration of the roads surface. Since then, the district has increasingly transformed itself into the focus area for real estate investments, because of its central, traffic-friendly but quiet location. A large part of the historically listed buildings were renovated, as well as numerous new shops, restaurants and bars opened (gentrification). The annual street festival is very popular attraction. In order to take into account the streets character as a residential street and pedestrian street, the road has been a 30 zone since 11 March 2008.

=== Traffic ===
The Donnersbergerstraße is now practically traffic-conducive, since the redesign of the Rotkreuzplatz a transit to the Nymphenburger Straße is no longer possible. The street takes over a function as a collection street for the surrounding areas as well as a feeder to the Kaufhof underground car park at Rotkreuzplatz.

Via the nearby Mittlerer Ring many parts of Munich as well as the motorways can be reached.

Since the construction of the resident parking garage, the annoying search for a parking spot is nonexistent.

Through public transport, the Donnersbergerstraße is served to the south by the tram lines 16 and 17 and bus lines 53 and 63. From the north the street is connected to the subway station Rotkreuzplatz (U1) as well as the tram line 12. At the Donnersberger bridge there is connection to all S-Bahn lines and to the Bavarian Oberlandbahn (BOB).

== Trivia ==
In Donnersbergerstraße 50a, the well-known folk actor Helmut Fischer (most famous role: Monaco Franze) grew up.

During the construction of the resident parking garage, the renovation of the property Donnersbergerstraße 42 had to take place because of an unexpected building collapse, which never was fully explained.
