= Trappentreustraße =

Street in Munich, Germany

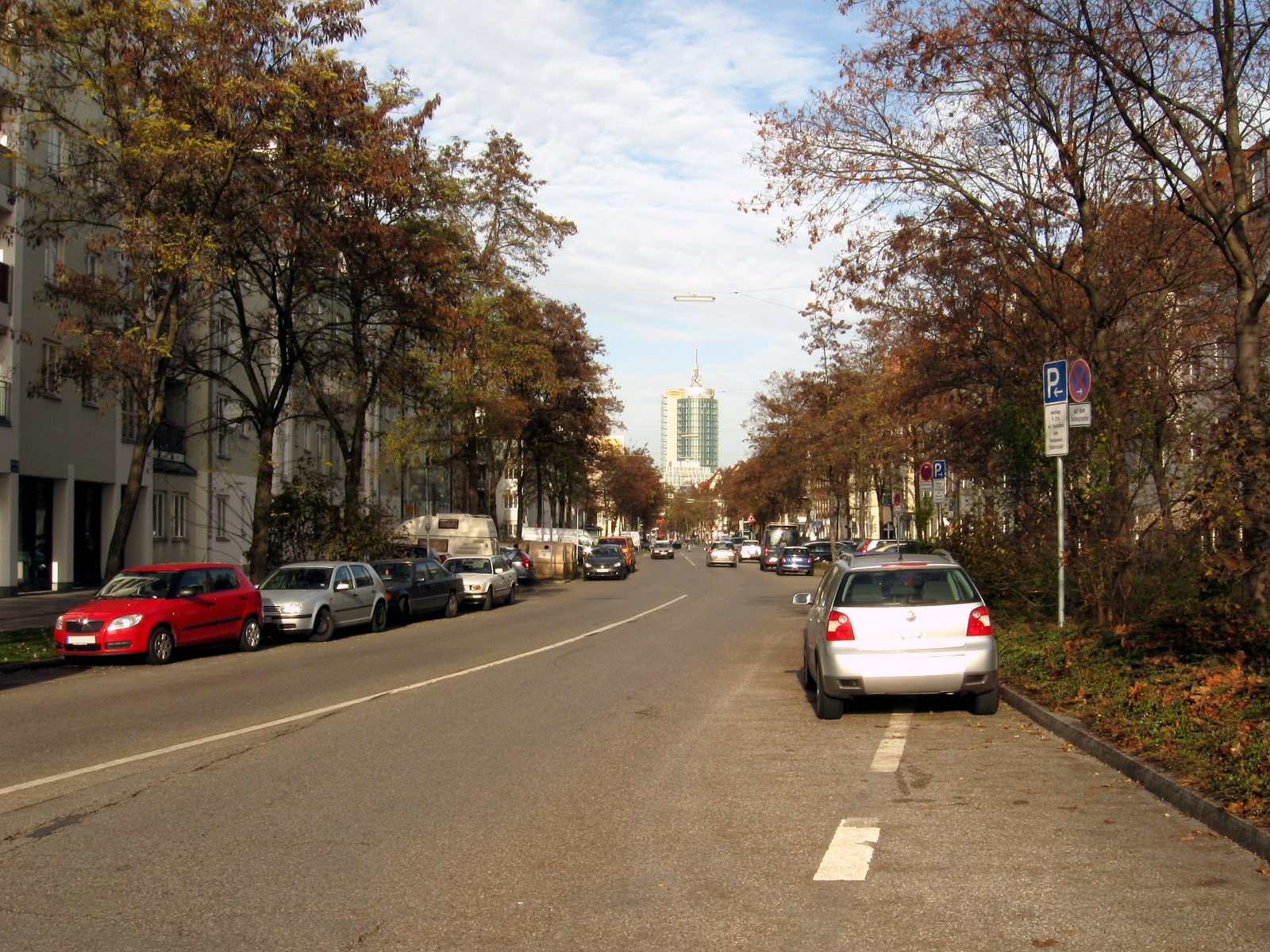
- View from Heimeranplatz heading north

- Location within Germany
- Namesake: Johann Baptist Trappentreu
- Length: 800 m (2,600 ft)
- Location: Munich
- Postal code: 80335, 80339
- Nearest metro station: Heimarerplatz (S7, U20)
- Coordinates: 48.81234°N 11.32384°E
- Major junctions: Donnersbergerbrücke, Garmischer Straße, Landsberger Straße, Guldeinstraße, Westendstraße, Tulbeckstraße, Gollierstraße, Kazmairstraße, Ridlerstraße

The Trappentreustraße is a street in the west of Munich and part of the Mittlerer Ring.

== Location ==
The Trappentreustraße is located about three kilometers west of Munich city center in the district Schwanthalerhöhe of the Westend district. It runs in a north-south direction.

Through the construction of the Trappentreutunnel, two route sections were created. On the northern section, up to 135,000 vehicles drive through the Mittlerer Ring daily, where as in the southern section above the tunnel, only 3,000 vehicles drive there daily.

The Trappentreustraße has about 3,300 residents.

== Route ==
The Trappentreustraße begins at the southern end of the Donnersbergerbrücke at the intersection Landsberger Straße (B 2 direction Augsburg) and runs south. The main lanes, with two lanes each, are routed via Landsberger Straße. The secondary lanes serve as feeders to the Landsberger Straße and the side streets. The main lane then goes into the, 1984 built, Trappentreutunnel.

After the vehicles in the secondary lanes merge with Guldeinstraße and the Westendstraße, and the main lane is in the tunnel, they continue on as a one-lane road. The road crosses the Tulbeckstraße and reaches the Gollierplatz. The throughway is prohibited for private transport from there until the intersection on Gollierstraße. After crossing Gollierstraße, the intersection with Kazmairstraße follows. The Trappentreustraße ends at Heimeranplatz.

At the southern end of the Heimeranplatz is also the end of the Trappentreutunnel and goes on from there to the Garmischer Straße towards Sendling-Westpark. The road traffic of the surface is connected to it via connection ramps.

== Traffic ==
Trappentreustraße in the area of the Mittlerer Ring plays a significant role in the Munich transport network. A relief of the southern section came in 1984, after the Trappentreutunnel opened and traffic was directed there.

In addition to several bus lines, north of the Donnersbergerbrücke is the location of the station, which carries the same name, and immediately south of Heimeranplatz are the S- and U-Bahn station, also named Heimerplatz, on the Münchner Südring.

For the dormant traffic a parking space management was introduced in the Trappentreustraße (southern section).

== History ==
In the second half of the 19th century, the architect Gabriel von Seidl created a noble suburb in the west of the city modeled from other major European cities. In this context, the Trappentreustraße was built and was initially an 18 meter wide side street.

From 1919 to 1920, the city built the tram line 22 through the Trappentreustraße, from the Alten Sendlinger Kirche (Old Sendlinger Church) to Rotkreuzplatz. The grand opening took place on March 23, 1920.

In the late 1960s and early 1970s, the Mittlerer Ring was built. For which the Trappentreustraße was widened to 38.5 meters. This was done by demolishing the houses on the west side of the street. Due to this new addition, the tram line 22 was put out of commission on 1 March 1970.

In the following years, the district intersected this partly eight-lane main traffic axis. Therefore, the city decided in the late 1970s to tunnel under the road. Construction began on 1 February 1980. On 16 October 1983, the Trappentreutunnel northern direction lanes were opened to traffic, the tube in southern direction was opened on 27 April 1984. Simultaneously with the construction of the tunnel, the city also built the underground line U4 and U5. These were opened on 10 March 1984 and received a station at Heimeranplatz.

The city rebuilt the surface in the years that followed back to a two-lane road. In order to prevent the passage of the entire Trappentreustraße for private traffic (which should use the tunnel), a so-called "plug" was installed at Gollierplatz. Here the passage is only allowed for public buses, taxis, and cyclists. Parking management was introduced in the 1990s.

== Naming ==
The street is named after Johann Baptist Trappentreu, who was known for his generous donations. In addition to the needs in Munich, he also donated to Africa and Palestine.

== Remarks ==
- Trappentreustraße in height of the Gollierplatz is blocked for private transport.
