= Schwanthalerhöhe =

Borough of Munich, Germany

Coordinates: 48.1389°N 11.5417°E

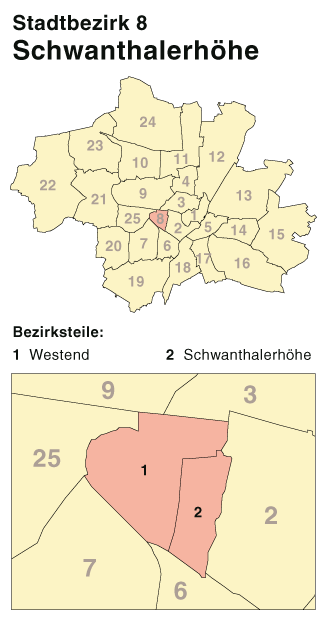
District map

Schwanthalerhöhe (German pronunciation: [ˈʃvantaːlɐˌhøːə]; Central Bavarian: Schwanthalahäh), also called Westend, is a borough of Munich. It is located west of the city center and with a population of about 30,000 on just two square kilometers is one of Munich's most densely populated boroughs.

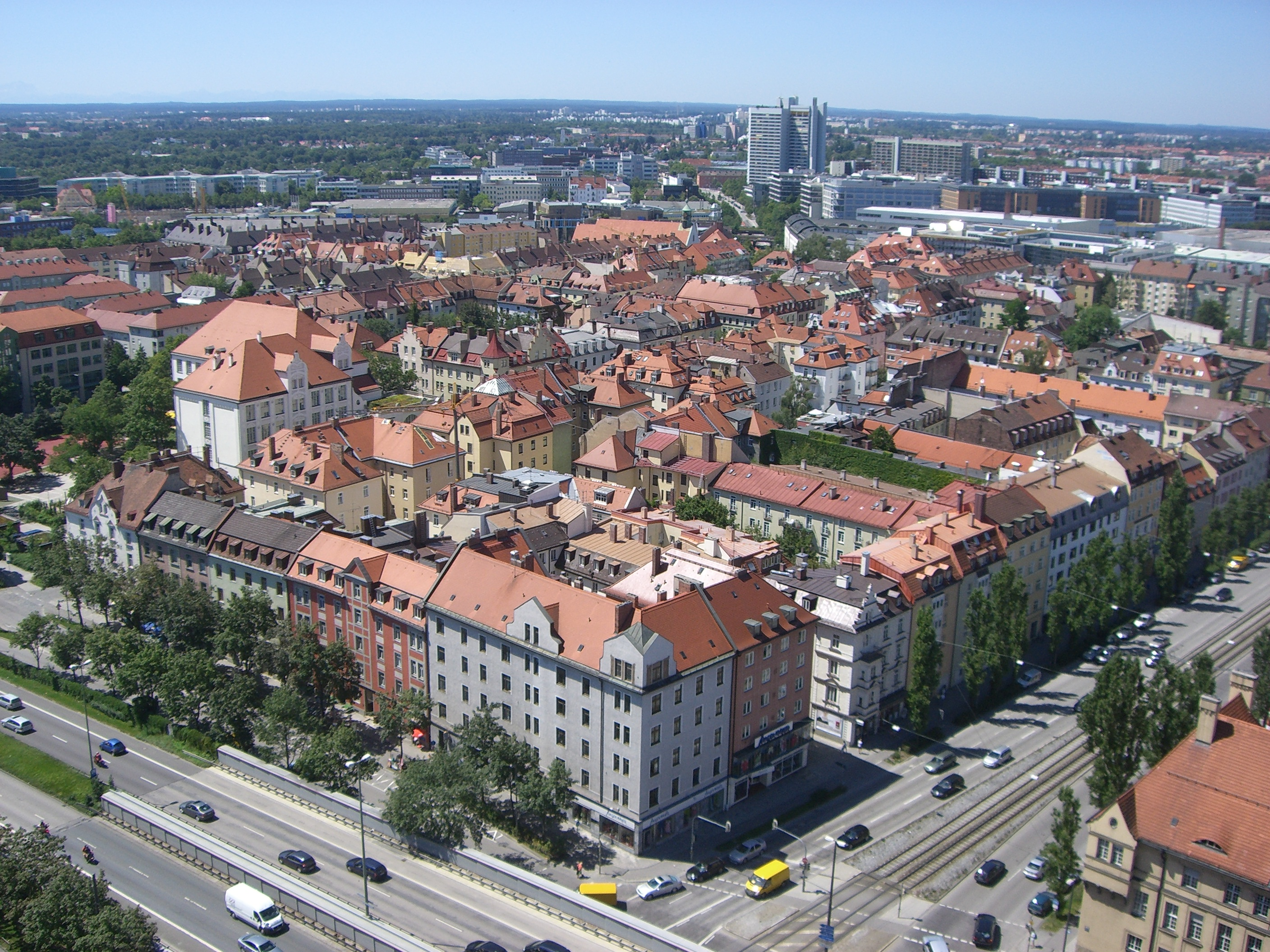
Western part of Westend
