= Pasing Town Hall =

Coordinates: 48°8′50″N 11°27′44″E

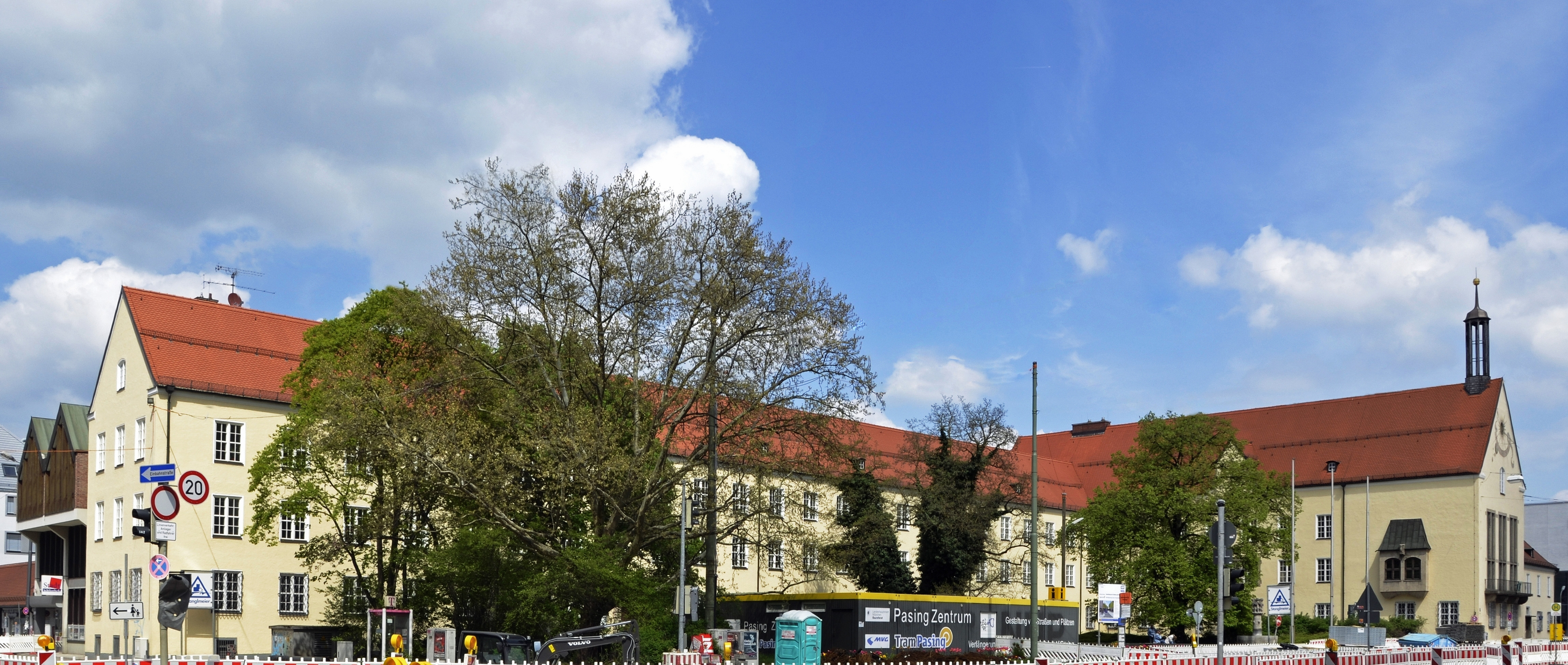
Pasing Town Hall, 2013

Pasing Town Hall (German: Rathaus Pasing) is the former town hall of the municipality of Pasing, Bavaria, Germany, which was incorporated into Munich in 1938.

== History ==
The municipality administration of Pasing was located, from 1901, in the then fire station on Bäckerstraße. After the 1905 city inspection, the town hall was planned to be built on the Marienplatz in Pasing.

For reasons of space and cost, however, the building was erected on the then Münchner Straße (today Landsberger Straße). After a construction period of fifteen months, the town hall was handed over to the Pasinger Lord Mayor Alois Wunder, on the 15 of November 1937. Unfortunately, the city of Pasing lost its independence only six months later and was incorporated as a district of Munich on 1 April 1938.

During the Second World War, the western wing was destroyed by a bomb in 1944 and the eastern part by an air mine in 1945. After the war, and during the period of office of the Mayor of Munich, Thomas Wimmer, the building was restored to its original form.

== Building ==
The Pasing town hall with 75 rooms, sitting room and adjoining rooms was built according to the plans of the architects Volbehr and Rettig for 450,000 Reichsmark.

In the council hall still hangs a tapestry of the Nazi artist Bruno Goldschmitt from the year 1938.

On 7 October 2002, the new building for 12.5 million Euro, built according to the plans of the architects Landau and Kindlbacher, including 49 rooms and a new wedding room, was opened.

In front of the town hall, the wedding fountain, created by the Pasinger sculptor Hans Osel, was erected in 1963.

== Today's use ==
The present town hall of Pasing was the only one of Munich's municipal authorities, which was directly subordinated to the mayor of Munich. This status was guaranteed until 31 March 2005 by the General Agreement of 8 January 1938. On the request of Lord Mayor Christian Ude, this contract was eliminated by the City Council and handed over to the Directorate, Social Council and District Administration Council.

Presently, the District Inspectorate, a Citizen's Office, the Municipal Office, the Social Office and the District Committee 21 are accommodated here.

The Pasing town hall was, in 1986, the world's first communal facility equipped with ISDN.
