= Allmann Sattler Wappner =

German architectural firm

Allmann Sattler Wappner Architekten GmbH
- Type: private (GmbH)
- Industry: architecture firm
- Founded: 1987; 39 years ago in Munich, Bavaria, Germany
- Headquarters: Munich, Germany
- Area served: worldwide
- Key people: Markus Allmann; Amandus Sattler; Ludwig Wappner
- Number of employees: ~100
- Website: www.allmannwappner.com

Allmann Sattler Wappner Architekten is a German architecture firm based in Munich. Established in 1987, it has existed in its current form since 1993. In 1997, Allmann Sattler Wappner Architekten received the German Architecture Award. Among many other buildings they designed the Dornier Museum in Friedrichshafen, the Herz Jesu Church and the Haus der Gegenwart in Munich. According to the firm they currently employ 100 members of staff.

Allmann Sattler Wappner Architekten has received several internationally recognized architecture awards, including the LEAF Award 2004 and the ECOLA Award 2006.

== History ==
The architecture firm was established in 1987 by Markus Allmann and Amandus Sattler. In 1990, the firm opened up its first office in the Munich area of Neuhausen-Nymphenburg. Ludwig Wappner joined the firm as the third partner in 1993. In the 1990s, the architecture firm benefited from projects coming out of post-reunification Germany's new federal states. Since 2004, Allmann Sattler Wappner Architekten has been a Limited Liability Company. After the turn of the millennium, the firm increasingly became involved in urban planning. In 2004, Allmann Sattler Wappner Architekten moved into a former piston factory, where the headquarters of the company continued to be. Nowadays, a large share of the business consists of tenders and competitions.

The founding partners of Allmann Sattler Wappner Architekten are also involved in academia: Markus Allmann was guest professor at the Peter Behrens School of Architecture of Düsseldorf University of Applied Sciences, and since 2006, he has been professor at the Institute of Conception of Space and Principles of Design at the University of Stuttgart. Among other engagements, Amandus Sattler has been visiting professor at the Cologne University of Applied Sciences and has given lectures at the Academy of Fine Arts in Munich, and the École Nationale Supérieur d‘Architecture in Nancy. Ludwig Wappner was guest professor at the Hochschule für Technik in Stuttgart, and since 2010 he is professor for Building Construction and Design at the Institute of Technology in Karlsruhe.

== Buildings ==
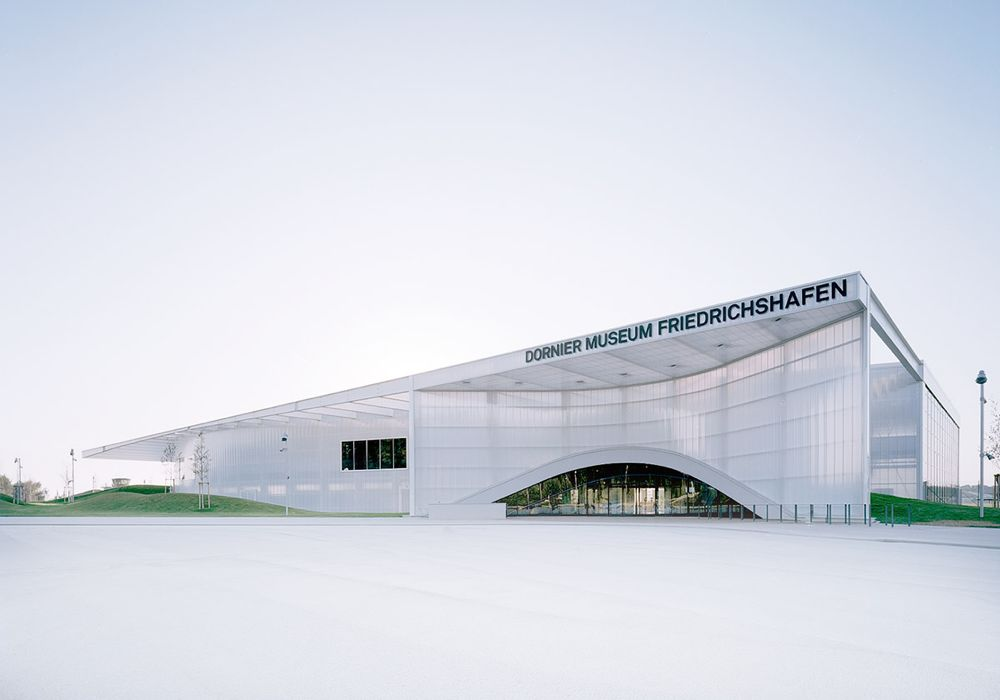
Dornier Museum (2009)

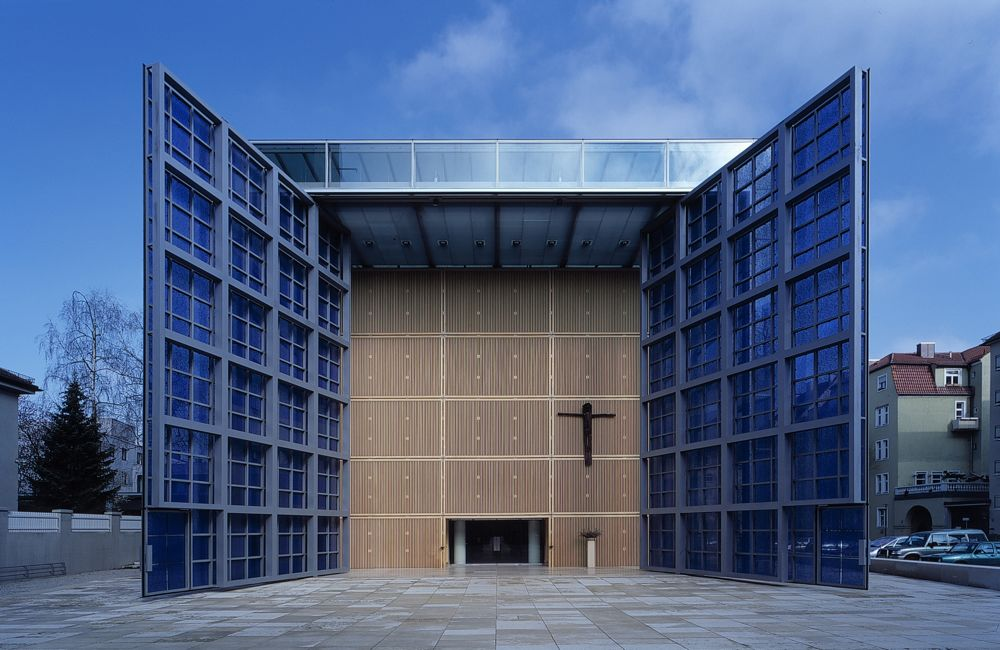
Herz Jesu Church (2002)

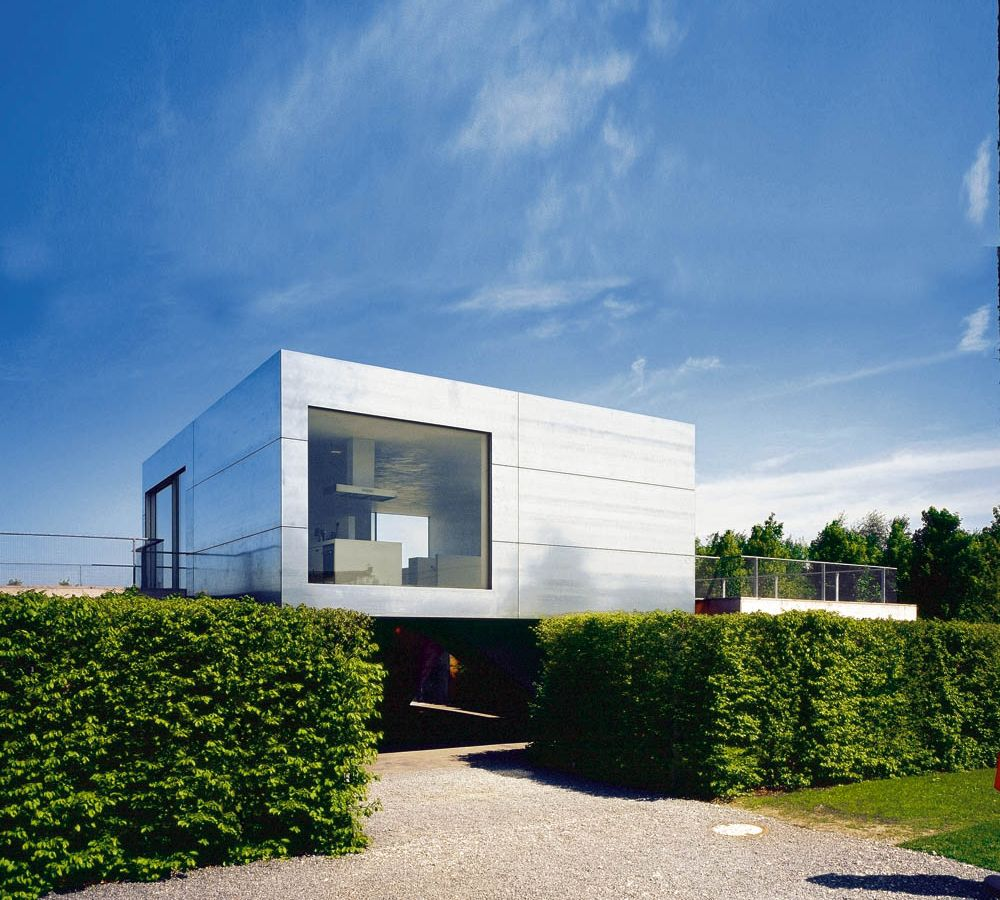
Haus der Gegenwart (2006)

According to journalist and architectural critic Klaus-Dieter Weiss, the signature traits of building projects by Allmann Sattler Wappner Architekten include "clear lines", "lightweight hovering structures" and "basic materials". In 1997, the architecture firm received the German Architecture Award for the Samuel von Pufendorf Secondary School in Flöha. It was the first major project by Allmann Sattler Wappner Architekten which gave the company nationwide recognition. The building was praised as a "monument to social awareness without monumentality". Up to the end of the 1990s, Allmann Sattler Wappner Architekten developed into a "vanguard" of modern German architecture, as Niklas Maak and Gerhard Matzig proclaimed in the Süddeutsche Zeitung, a large German daily newspaper.

The year 2000 marked the unveiling of a controversial new building designed by the architecture firm, the Herz Jesu Church in Munich. It is essentially a glass cube, the portals of which can be opened up almost completely. In 2002, Allmann Sattler Wappner attracted major attention for a building complex housing the training facilities and the administration of Südwestmetall, the Baden-Wuerttemberg employers' organization of the metal and electrical industry, in Reutlingen. The entire facade was completely covered with stainless steel plates, combining the individual building elements into a single unit. The Swiss daily newspaper Neue Zürcher Zeitung described it as an "esthetic innovation" that immediately catches the eye. In 2001, the magazine-style supplement Süddeutsche Zeitung Magazin sponsored a competition for a home of the future, which was to be built on the grounds of the Federal Horticulture Show in Munich. Allmann Sattler Wappner Architekten won the tender with a design that combined several independent building structures into one home. The Haus der Gegenwart was officially opened in 2005. In 2009, the Dornier Museum in Friedrichshafen, another project by the architecture firm, received rave reviews in the media.

Additional buildings designed by Allmann Sattler Wappner Architekten include the two shopping centers, Düsseldorf Arcaden and Munich's Pasing Arcaden. Since 2005, the company has had worldwide responsibility for the corporate architecture of Audi car showrooms. An example of work in an urban environment is the redesign of the cathedral square Cologne. Already back in 2002, Allmann Sattler Wappner Architekten had won a competition for the further development of the area flanking the east side of the cathedral in Cologne. Construction began in 2013 and particularly involved the area around the Museum Ludwig. One of the latest projects of Allmann Sattler Wappner Architekten in 2015 was the modernization of subway station Marienplatz in Munich. Its orange-red ceiling was the subject of controversial discussion.
