= Landsberger Straße =

Street in Munich, Germany

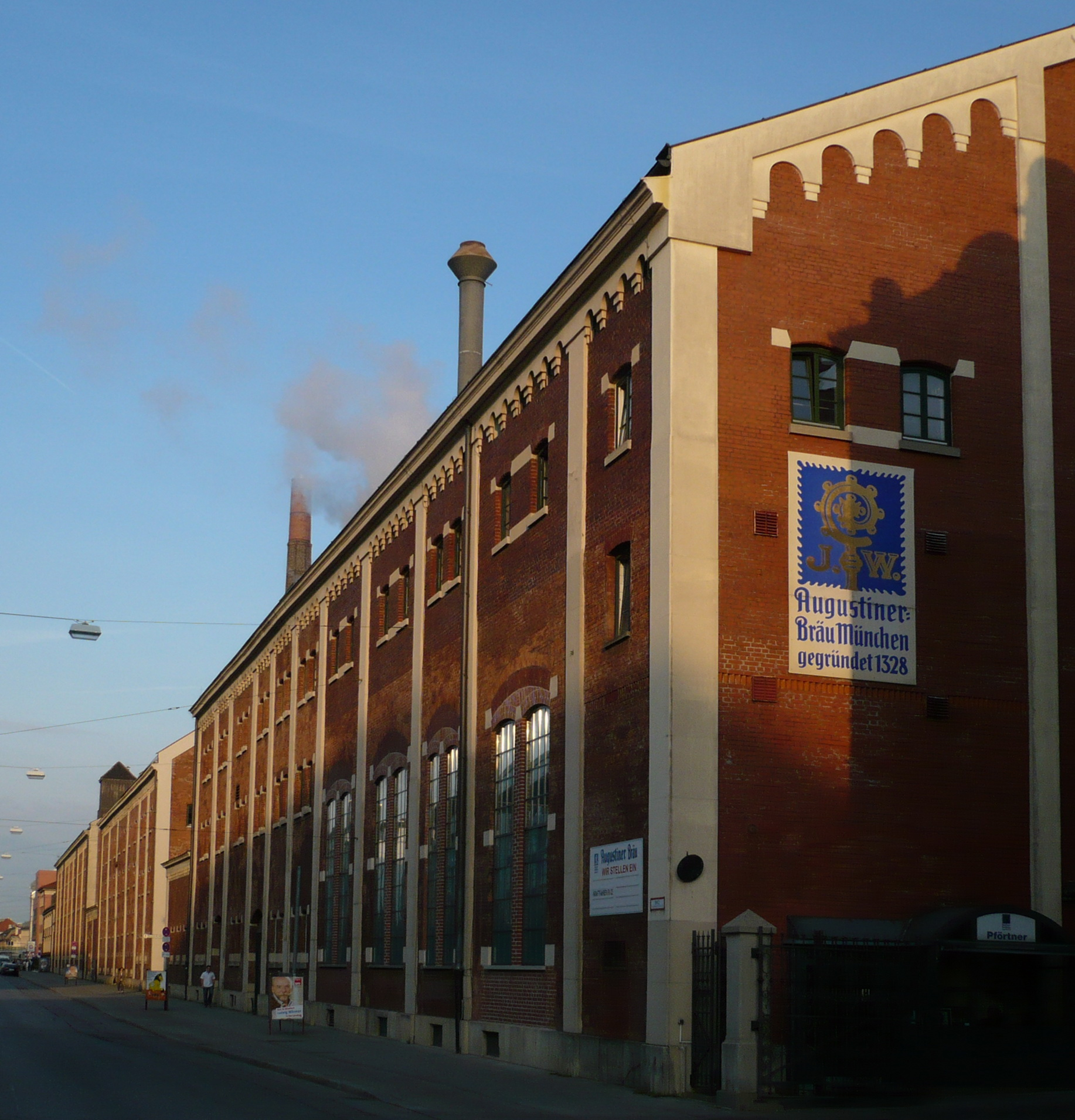
Augustiner-Bräu on Landsberger Strasse

The Landsberger Straße is one of the main arterial roads in Munich.

== Route ==
The road, with a length of about 6.6 km, leads south into the extension of the Bayerstraße, parallel to the railway lines of the Munich-Hauptbahnhof-Munich-Pasing-Augsburg tracks from the confluence of the Martin-Greif-Straße, through the Munich urban districts of Schwanthalerhöhe (Westend), Laim and Pasing until the Pasinger Marienplatz. At its eastern end, the road crosses the small ridge of the Theresienhöhe / Maßmannbergl, a runoff from the western high bay of the Isar Valley. The roads continuation to the west is the Bodenseestraße. From its junction with the Mittlerer Ring at the Trappentreustraße / Donnersbergerbrücke, it forms a section of the Bundesstraße 2 to the west. At the height of the Laim S-Bahn station, the Wotanstraße coming from the north through the Laimer underpass and the south coming Fürstenrieder Straße (both parts of the so-called outer ring) cross. In the center of Pasing, however, the B2 is routed further north through the Nordumgehung Pasing on to the Josef-Felder-Straße. The tram runs on the Landsberger Straße from the eastern end of the street to Elsenheimerstraße and then from the street Am Knie to the center of Pasinger.

The road crosses two railway lines, namely the Münchner Südring through an underpass and the Sendlinger Spange by means of a bridge, the Hackerbrücke.

== Name ==
The name of the street comes from the city Landsberg am Lech, which is reached further down the route of the road.

== Important buildings on the street ==
On the Landsberger Straße there are, among others, the operating buildings of the Augustiner-Bräu (Augustiner brewery) (No. 31–35), the Central Tower München high-rise building, the former Hauptzollamt (main customs office) (No. 122–132), the Persil-Schule (No. 150), the ICE-Halle der Deutsche Bahn (No. 158), a hall from the Jehovah's Witnesses, the Villa Kürth near the Laimer underpass, the Munich branch of Steinway & Sons (formerly Pianohaus Lang) (No. 336), the Pasinger Rathaus and the Pasing Arcaden 2.

At the corner of Elsenheimerstraße is a sculpture that was erected by Reinhart R. Wolke.

The street was used as a filming location for Michael Jackson's "Give In to Me" music video in 1992, just two days before the Dangerous World Tour started.

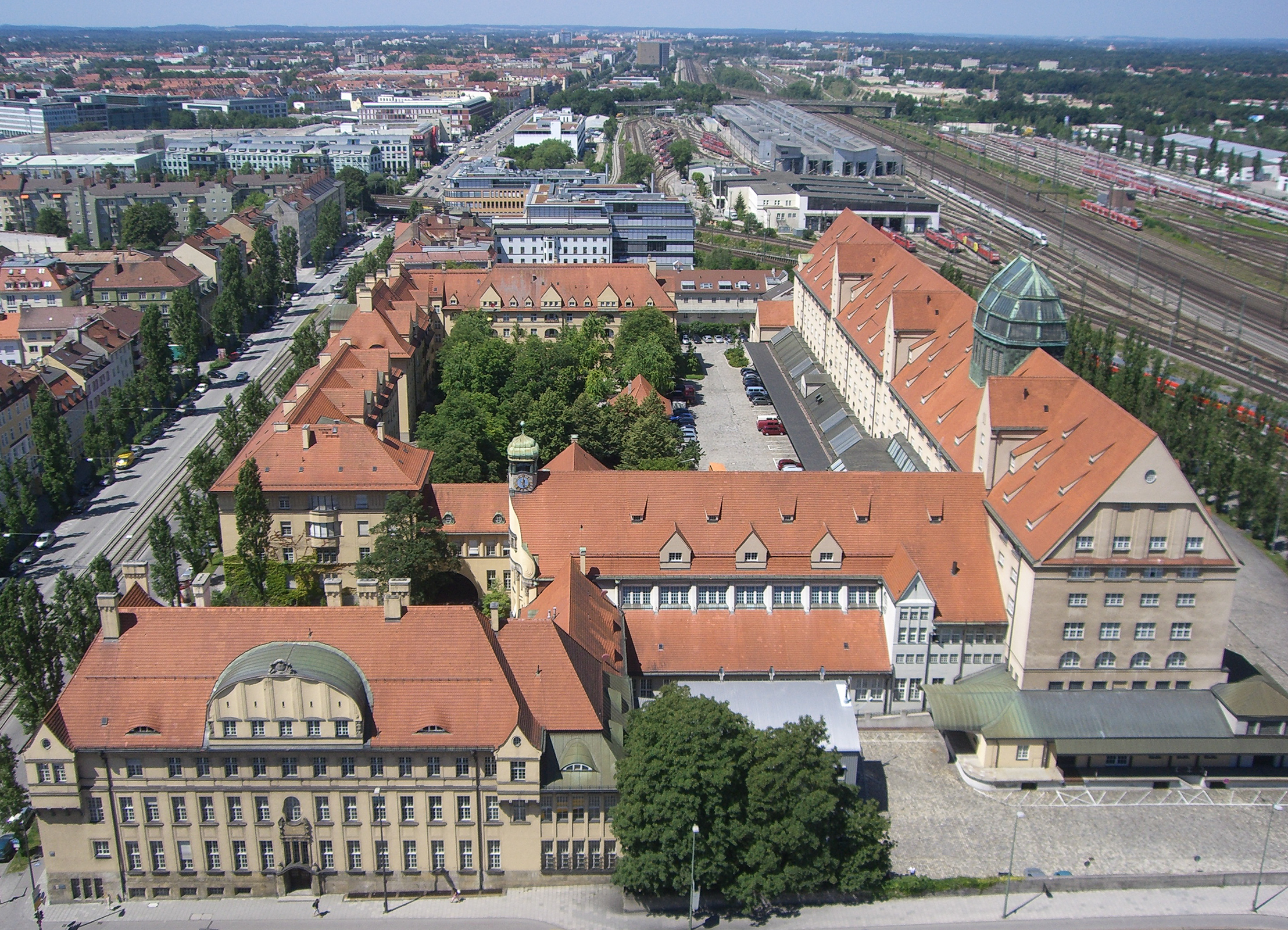
The Landsberger Straße at the former Hauptzollamt (the street to the left of the building complex)

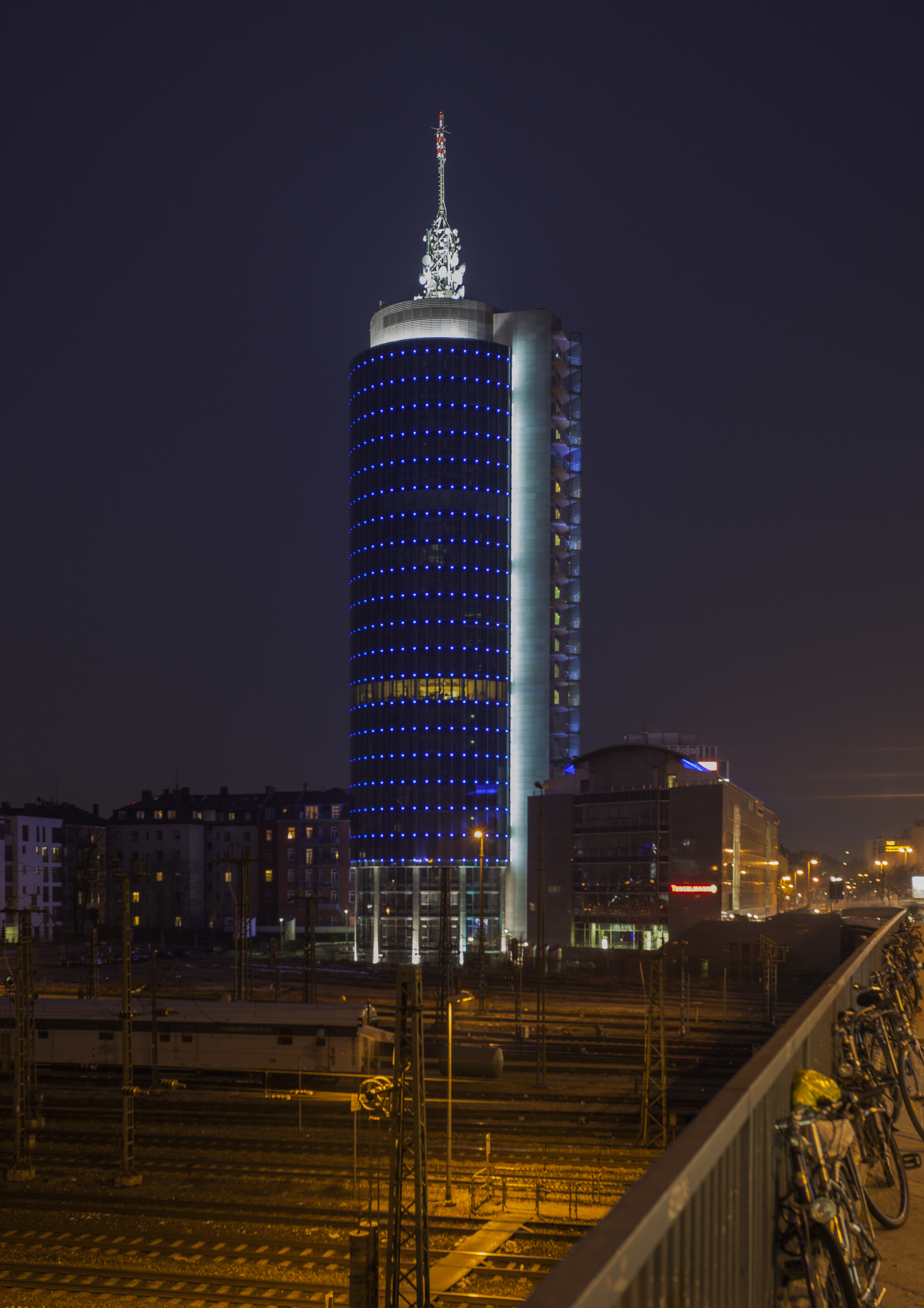
Central Tower München

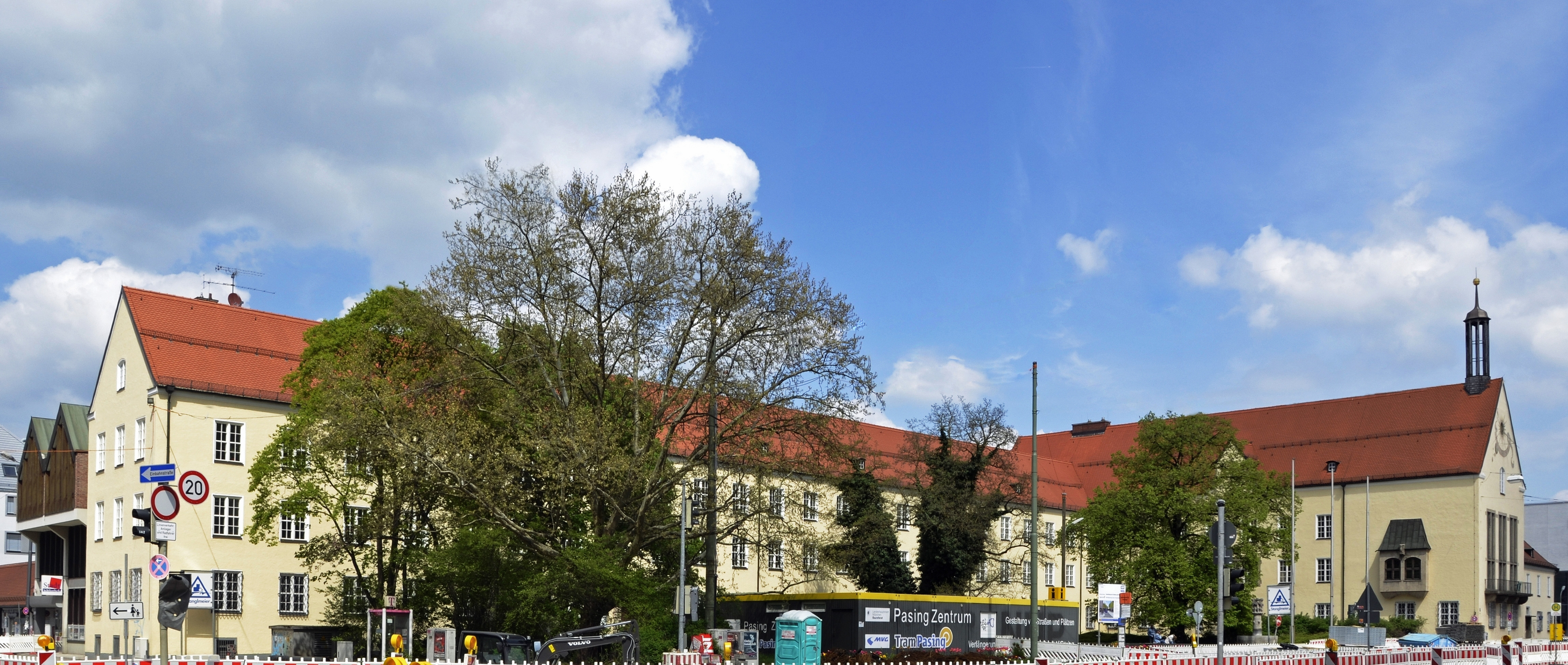
Pasinger Rathaus

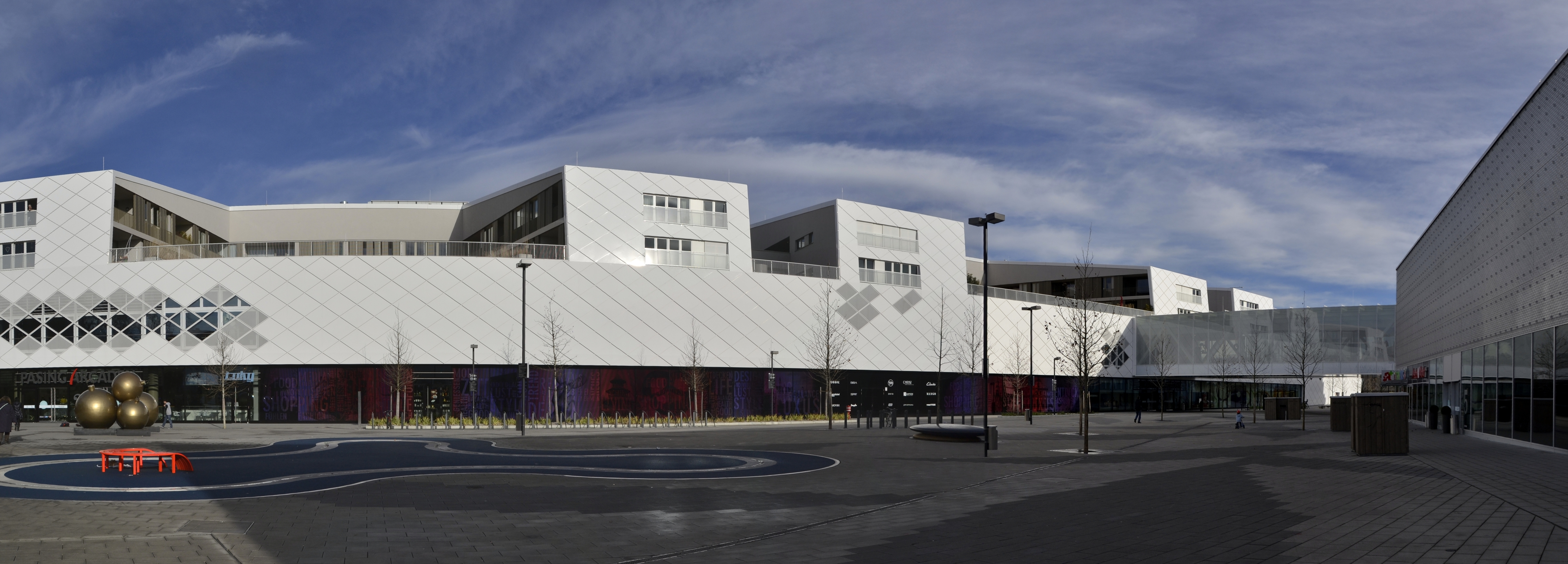
Pasing Arcaden
