= Gordon Watkinson =

American visual artist (born 1964)

Gordon Watkinson (born in 1964 in Charlottesville, Virginia, United States) is an American visual artist whose work has a strong focus on architecture and design. Fascinated by forms, structures and materials Watkinson explores the role of architecture and design as life changing tools, while revisiting both visually and conceptually major architectural shifts from a contemporary perspective, with a particular emphasis on the modernist era.

== Early Beginning ==
Watkinson discovered photography accidentally while studying at Virginia Commonwealth University in Richmond, Virginia. Watkinson borrowed a camera for a photography class he took at the age of 24. Although he had not thought of photography in a serious way, after completing the course his professor saw enough in his work that he encouraged Watkinson to reconsider his career choice and arrange for him to begin working as a photographic assistant.

== Work ==
Inspired by a visit to the Bauhaus school in Dessau, Germany in the 1990s Gordon Watkinson created the large-scale traveling exhibition Bauhaus twenty-21: An Ongoing Legacy, featuring the work of Bauhaus masters and students Marcel Breuer, Walter Gropius, Hannes Meyer, Ludwig Mies van der Rohe, Georg Muche, and Richard Paulick in dialogue with early 21st century's buildings by established as well as internationally renowned architects such as RCR, Sauerbruch Hutton, Werner Sobek or Gert Wingårdh. Presented under the patronage of UNESCO the exhibition opened at the German Architecture Museum in Frankfurt, Germany in March 2009, commemorating the 90th anniversary of the Bauhaus. Since then it has been touring extensively throughout Europe (Kraków, Nice, Munich, Stockholm, Ljubljana, Bratislava, Brussels, Eindhoven, Tampere) and is currently touring in the US.

Bauhaus Sign Photo by Gordon Watkinson

Watkinson's contemporary work documents 12 of the most significant examples of Bauhaus architecture in more than 100 photographs. Watkinson’s images are accompanied by a selection of digitized, historic blueprints and sketches that illustrate the buildings’ innovative design characteristics and construction techniques. Presented alongside each of the Bauhaus selections are comparative projects by renowned contemporary architects, which make clear the ongoing legacy of Bauhaus principles in 21st-century international practice. Honoring the fact that architectural design is best understood experientially, and not simply through the eyes, the exhibition, Bauhaus twenty-21 also includes room-like settings of Bauhaus-design furniture and objects, inviting visitors to interact physically with distinctive environments expressed by these seminal early 20th-century designs.

Watkinson is also known for commercial photography in the fields of advertising, architecture, design and fashion for clients such as the Spiegel catalog and Texas Instruments. In conjunction with his photographic work, he has directed commercials, and industrial videos. In Watkinson's work a strong sense of both forms and materials becomes apparent, as well as his appreciation for timeless and minimalist design.

Watkinson's singular vision of architecture, with its particular emphasis on frontal views and abstract forms as well as on the materiality of the structures, has shaped an important body of work photographing architecture and design, including buildings and objects by Marcel Breuer, Eileen Gray, Le Corbusier, Jacobus Oud, Jean Prouvé, and also sculpture, more particularly the work of Auguste Rodin.

Watkinson's work has been published in The Dallas Morning News (US), ELLE Decoration (Germany), Frankfurter Allgemeine Zeitung (Germany), Numéro (France), Le Point (France), PHOTO International (Germany), Süddeutsche Zeitung-Magazin (Germany).

Watkinson regularly lectures and gives workshops in museums and universities both in Europe and in the US, most recently at the National Museum of Art, Architecture and Design in Oslo (Norway), at the Bauhaus University in Weimar (Germany), at Mississippi State University and at the University of Memphis.

== Exhibitions ==
- 2016 – Bauhaus twenty-21: An Ongoing Legacy, Palm Springs Art Museum, Palm Springs (CA) / USA
- 2014 – Bauhaus twenty-21: An Ongoing Legacy, Price Tower Arts Center, Bartlesville (OK) / USA
- 2013 – Bauhaus twenty-21: An Ongoing Legacy, Art Museum of the University of Memphis, Memphis (TN) / USA
- 2013 – Bauhaus twenty-21: An Ongoing Legacy, Arkansas Arts Center, Little Rock (AR) / USA
- 2013 – Bauhaus twenty-21: An Ongoing Legacy, Jule Collins Smith Museum of Fine Art, Auburn University, Auburn (AL) / USA
- 2013 – Bauhaus twenty-21: An Ongoing Legacy, Tampere Art Museum, Tampere / Finland
- 2012 – Bauhaus twenty-21: An Ongoing Legacy, Yksi Expo, Eindhoven / The Netherlands
- 2011 – Bauhaus twenty-21: An Ongoing Legacy, CIVA Centre International pour la Ville, l’Architecture et le Paysage, Brussels / Belgium
- 2011 – Bauhaus twenty-21: An Ongoing Legacy, design factory, Bratislava / Slovakia
- 2010 – Bauhaus twenty-21: An Ongoing Legacy, Jacopic Gallery, Ljubljana / Slovenia
- 2010 – Bauhaus twenty-21: An Ongoing Legacy, Nordbygg, Nordic Building & Construction Fair, Stockholm / Sweden
- 2010 – Bauhaus twenty-21: An Ongoing Legacy, Haus der Gegenwart, Munich / Germany
- 2009 – Bauhaus twenty-21: An Ongoing Legacy, Forum d’Urbanisme et d’Architecture, Nice / France
- 2009 – Bauhaus twenty-21: An Ongoing Legacy, International Cultural Center Kraków, Kraków / Poland
- 2009 – Bauhaus twenty-21: An Ongoing Legacy, German Architecture Museum (Deutsches Architekturmuseum), Frankfurt / Germany

== Books ==
- Bauhaus twenty-21. An Ongoing Legacy. With texts by Falk Jaeger and Peter Cachola Schmal, as well as contributions by Michael Siebenbrodt and twelve prominent architects. 140 duotone photographs and 60 line drawings . Basel: Birkhäuser, 2009
- Bauhaus zwanzig-21. Ideen für ein neues Jahrhundert. Mit Essays von Falk Jaeger und Peter Cachola Schmal sowie Beiträgen von Michael Siebenbrodt und zwölf prominenten Architekten. 140 Duotone Fotografien und 60 Zeichnungen. Basel: Birkhäuser, 2009
- Bauhaus XX-XXI. Dziedzictwo wciąż żywe. Cracow: International Cultural Centre, 2009
