= Nordumgehung Pasing =

Street in Pasing, Munich, Germany

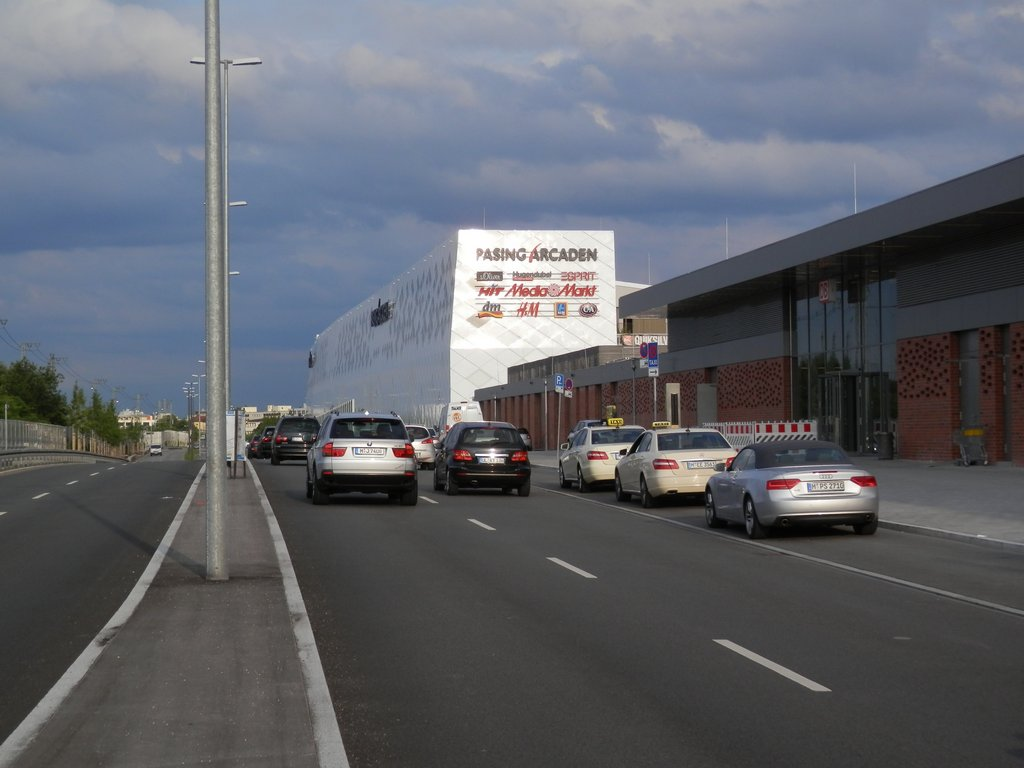
Josef-Felder-Straße (on the right of the new Pasinger train station building and the Pasing Arcaden, to the left of the tracks)

The Nordumgehung Pasing is a bypass that leads around the center of Pasing and the Bundesstraße 2 (federal highway).

== Background ==
The B2, which provides Munich with an important north–south connection, represents one of the main access roads of the Bavarian state capital. In the western district of Pasing, it leads along the Bodenseestraße, the Pasinger Marienplatz and the Landsberger Straße to the Bundesstraße 2 R, the middle ring. Every day about 80,000 vehicles cross through Pasing via the B2.

To relieve the pressure on the center of Pasing and its pedestrian-friendly design, the B2 was swiveled and routed through the Nordumgehung Pasing (NUP). This new bypass, whose construction was started in 2008, was opened to traffic in 2012.

== Route ==
The Nordumgehung Pasing shears west of the town center from the previous road to the north, following the Lortzingstraße and continues south along the train lines to the east. The train station and the Offenbachstraße are crossed using previously existent freight and industrial areas, until the road turns to the south and meets the Landsberger Straße. The Landsberger Straße is to be separated in east–west direction at the Pasinger Marienplatz, so that connecting traffic is to be expected only in this section; the load on the central section should be only between 2,000 and 10,000 vehicles a day. The relieved from traffic, Pasinger Marienplatz, is then to be redesigned, to which a pedestrian zone is to be provided between Pasinger station square and Landsberger Straße in Gleichmannstraße and Bäckerstraße.

The Nordumgehung is to run above ground in the area of the Munich Pasing station between the terminal building and platforms, with taxi ranks and a Kiss & Ride lane to be provided in the terminal building.

The newly created road between Landsberger Straße / Am Knie and Lortzingstraße was named Josef-Felder-Straße after a decision of the city council on 1 October 2009.
