= Hans Nimmerfall =

German politician (1872–1934)

Hans Nimmerfall (October 25, 1872 – August 20, 1934) was a Bavarian politician of the Social Democratic Party of Germany (SPD).

Nimmerfall was member of the city council of the former city of Pasing (district of Munich since 1938), as well as a member of the Bavarian parliament from 1912 bis 1918 (representative of Pasing and neighborhood). In 1915, he was founder of Pasings' housing co-op "Sporer-Block", and thenceforward president of the association, which aimed for minimize housing shortage. He was chairman of the inaugural meeting of the local SPD associations of Mauth-Finsterau (December 18, 1918) and Aubing-Neuaubing (March 3, 1921). In 1919, he was state council at the Bavarian ministry for military affairs (Germ.: Staatsministerium für militärische Angelegenheiten).

After the 1933 Machtergreifung and the seizure of power in the im city hall of Pasing by the Nazis, he and others were deported to the Dachau concentration camp in 1933. He was not in the best of health, and died due to the misusages shortly after his release in Pasing.

Today, the Nimmerfallstraße (before Horst-Wessel-Straße) in Munich-Pasing is named in honor of him.

== Bibliography ==
- Pasinger Archiv, Volume 1993, Pasinger Archiv e.V.. ISBN 978-3-9802861-8-3
