= Pasinger Marienplatz =

Square in Munich

Coordinates: 48°08′48″N 11°27′34″E

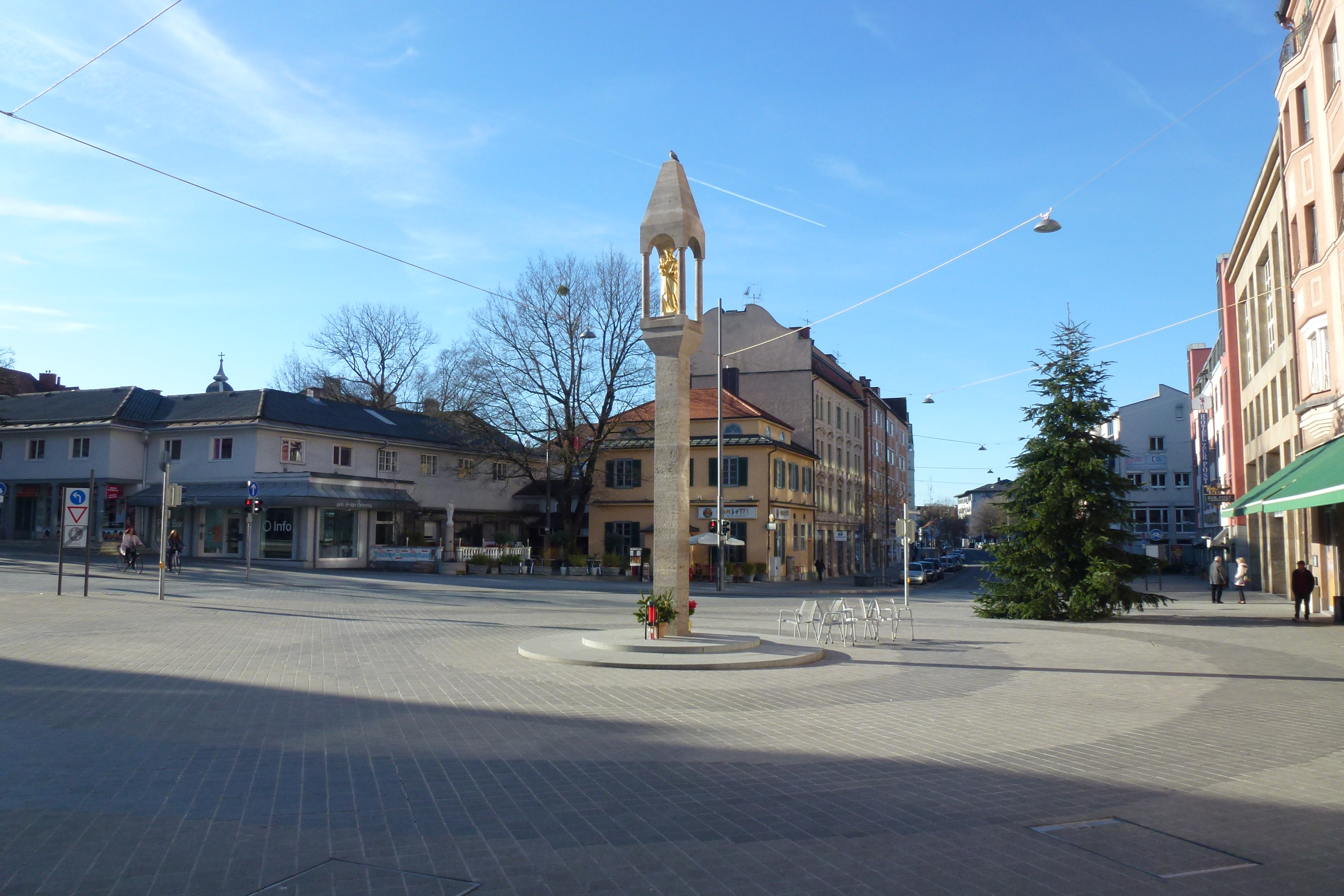
Pasinger Marienplatz 2015

The Pasinger Marienplatz is the central square of the formerly independent city of Pasing. Pasing has been a district of Munich since 1938. In order to distinguish the square from the Munich Marienplatz, it bears the name Pasinger Marienplatz ever since.

== History ==
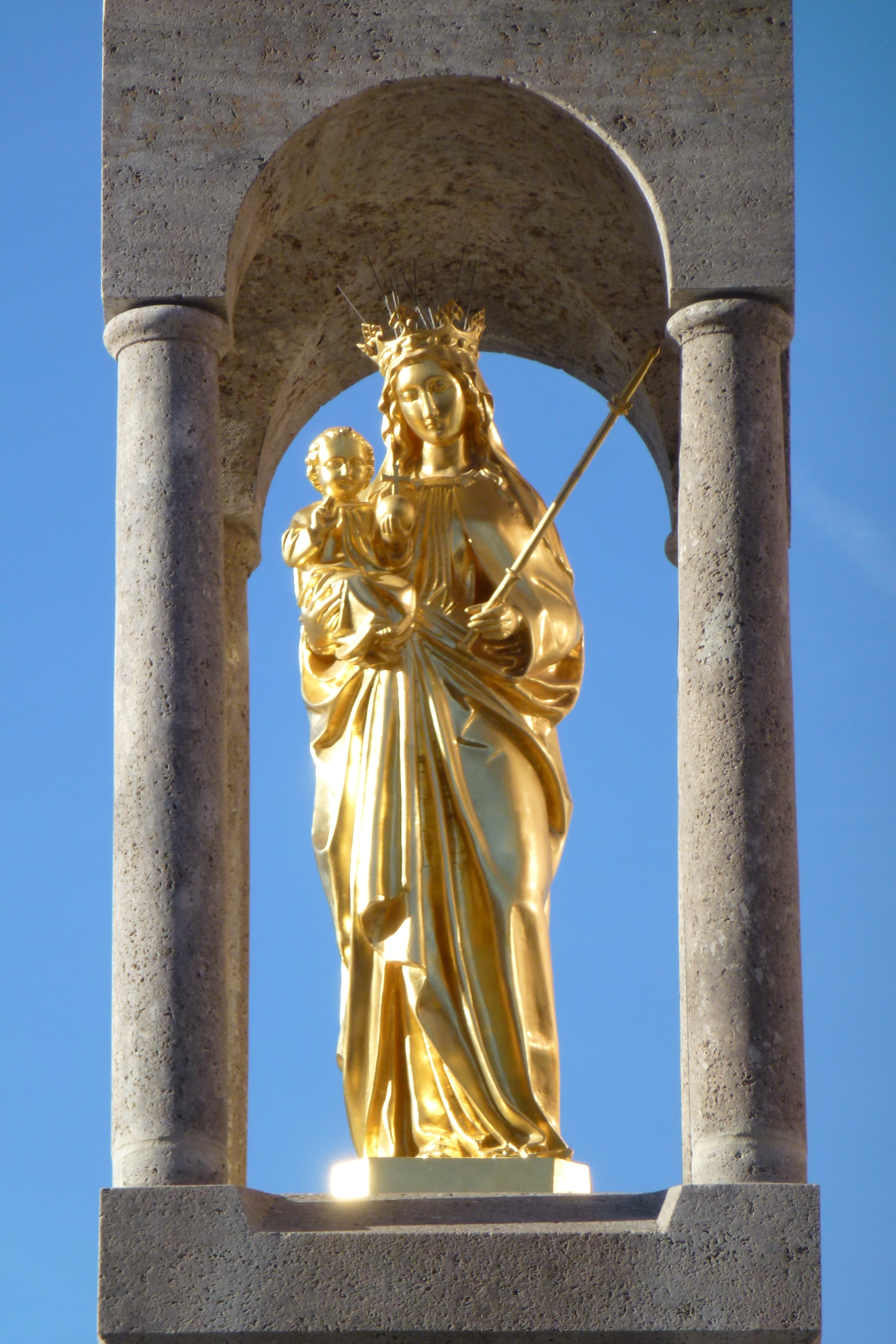
Marien figure of the Pasinger Mariensäule

Modeled after the Munich Marienplatzes, the intersection of the historic river-accompanying main street, (now: Planegger Straße), with the east–west direction extending, former ducal salt road (now: Landsbergerstraße and Bodenseestraße), was named Marienplatz. For this purpose, the Pasinger Mariensäule was inaugurated on 31 October 1880, which at that time consisted of a slender, cast-iron pillar and Madonna statue still used today. Already in 1908, the Mariensäule was dismantled, since the new Tram train line (line 19 and at times also 29) had its end point there and the area was needed for alignment tracks, or a train turning point.

As a result of the increasing traffic, an elongated traffic island was built on Marienplatz, where cars could initially be parked. Later, taxi only parking was placed around the traffic island.

After the association, Pasinger Mariensäule e.V., began to rebuild the Mariensäule in 1977, the square was redesigned in 1980. A triangular traffic island was created with the Mariensäule in the middle. On the new rectangular pedestal was also a square pillar, upon which a canopy was placed, in which the Madonna statue stood. The statue faced the north, as it did before, towards the so-called Kopfmiller House. The edge of the traffic island was fenced by pillars and chains to the north side and around the pillars were several wide, barrel-like flower tubs.

As part of the redevelopment and traffic reduction of the Pasinger center through the construction of the Nordumgehung Pasing (northern bypass), Pasing Marienplatz was rebuilt in 2013 and the Mariensäule was moved a bit to the north. According to plans by landscape architects Burger und Kühn, the old pillar was placed on a circular base, consisting of groups of rings of light granite and dark basalt. The direction that the statue faces was turned to the east (in the direction of Munich).

== Location ==
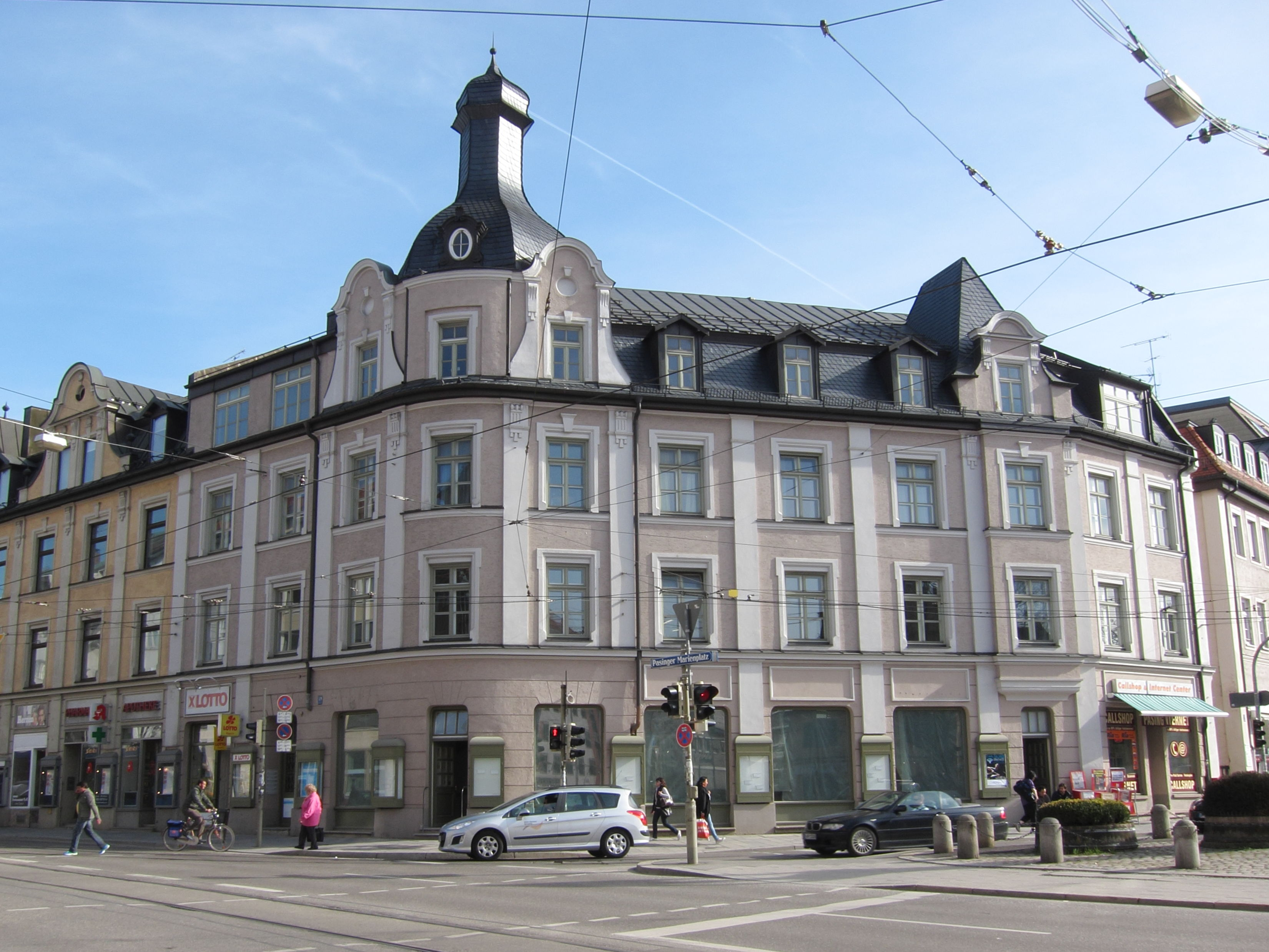
Kring-Haus

The Marienplatz is bordered to the north by the Gasthof zu Post and the Kopfmiller-Haus. On the east side are the so-called Kring-Haus and the Röder-Haus, where retail stores are located. This is followed by the Apothekerhaus with the St. Jakobs Apotheke, founded in 1880; one of the former owners was Fritz Dürrfeld.

The south side of Marienplatz borders the Institute of the English Miss. On the west side is the so-called Pappschachtel (cardboard box), a makeshift building with shops and restaurants from the period between the two world wars, the 1921 created little Marienbrunnen and the historically protected Confetti-Haus.

== Traffic ==
The center of Pasing was burdened in recent decades by heavy traffic, because of which the attractiveness of the district suffered and also restricted the development opportunities for retail. The formerly running over the Marienplatz, B 2, was relocated to the Pasinger station north running the Nordumgehung Pasing, at the end of 2012, and the Marienplatz was freed from the east–west transit traffic. The tram has been extended to the Pasinger station and now only touches the Marienplatz marginally when it turns off from the north coming Gleichmannstraße to the East leading Landsberger Straße. This is the only way for cars to drive on the Pasinger Marienplatz, in addition to the turn-off from the west running Bodenseestraße into the south leading Planegger Straße (and vice versa). Only buses and taxis are allowed to cross the square from Planegger Straße.

== Criticism ==
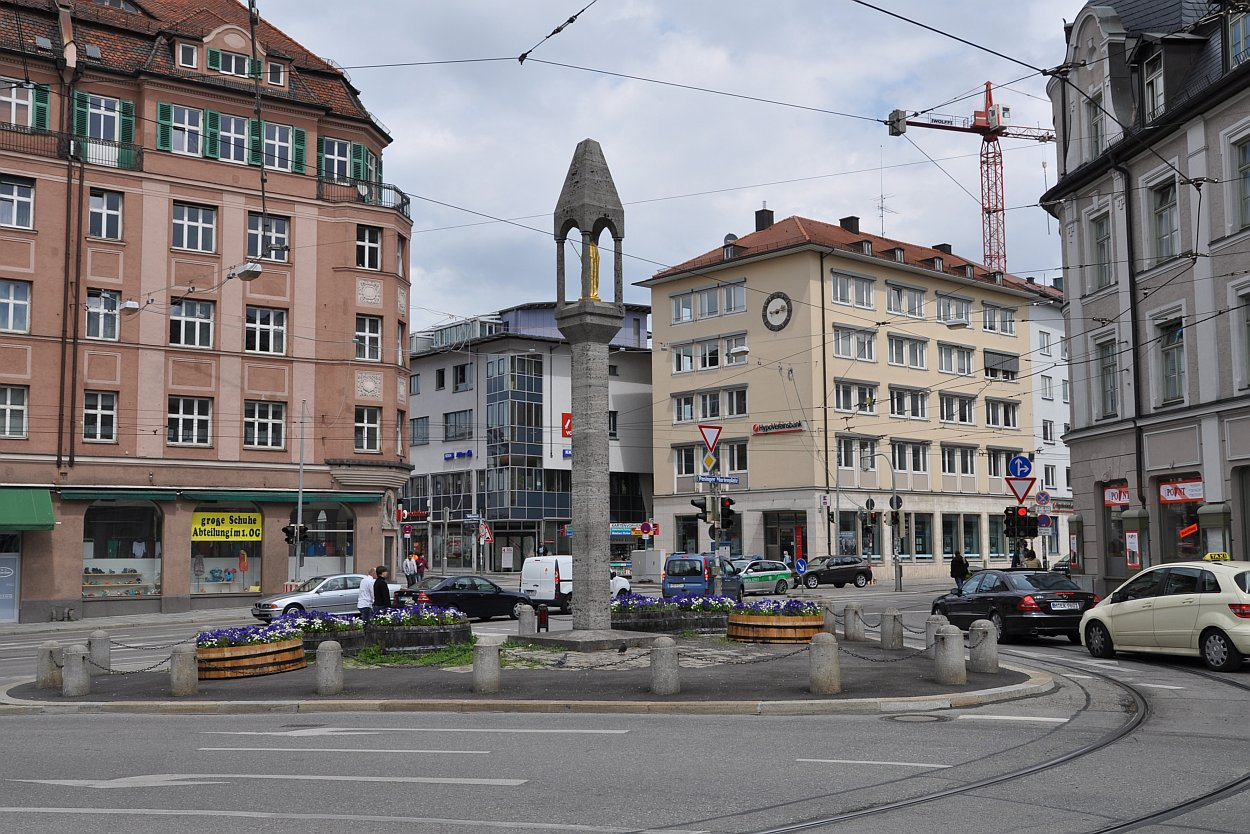
Pasinger Marienplatz before the last transformation

The redesign of the Pasinger Marienplatz was accepted differently. Often a positive feature is the enormous decline of former traffic loads and the idea of creating a pedestrian zone. Critics complain however, that the place is not a welcome meeting place due to the lack of greenery (flowers or trees) and the lack of seating, making it feel drab and empty. Even the subsequently erected metal chairs could possibly provide a temporary solution. Likewise, the pattern of the pavement stones can only be seen from an aerial perspective and appear unstructured from the ground. In addition, some critics say that it lacks an enclosure around the base of the Mariensäule, so that prayers could be spoken in a separate area, or the repeated damage to the lights on the base by users of the road could be prevented.
