= August-Exter-Straße =

Street in Pasing, Munich, Germany

Coordinates: 48.151214°N 11.462528°E

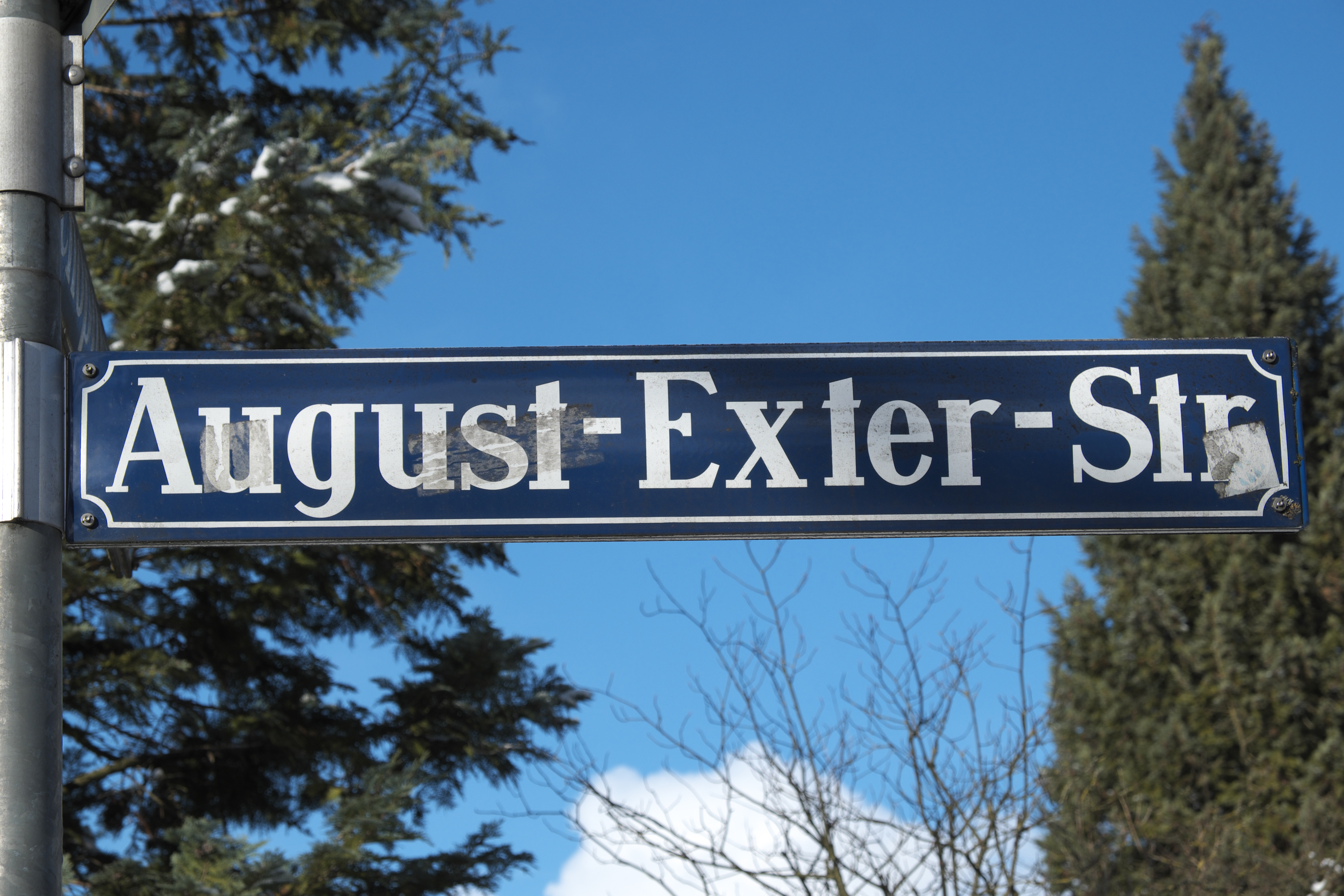

The August-Exter-Straße, named after the architect August Exter (1858–1933), is a street in Pasing, a district of Munich, which was created in 1892 as part of the development of the Villenkolonie Pasing I.

== History ==
The August-Exter-Strasse starts at the north side of the Munich Pasing station and runs north-east to Offenbachstraße, to which an existing route was usduring ist creation. Around 1895, under the direction of the office August Exter, began the closed development with medium sized villas on both northern sides of the Wensauerplatz section. Since in the course of the twentieth century only a few new buildings were erected along the street, specifically in the Wensauerplatz area, the August-Exter-Strasse preserved the character of the villa district.

== Historical buildings ==
- August-Exter-Straße 8 (Villa)
- August-Exter-Straße 9 (Villa)
- August-Exter-Straße 10 (Villa)
- August-Exter-Straße 15 (Villa)
- August-Exter-Straße 19 (Villa)
- August-Exter-Straße 20 (Villa)
- August-Exter-Straße 21 (Villa)
- August-Exter-Straße 22 (Villa)
- August-Exter-Straße 23 (Villa), Semi-detached house with Nr. 25
- August-Exter-Straße 24 (Villa)
- August-Exter-Straße 25 (Villa), Semi-detached house with Nr. 23
- August-Exter-Straße 27 (Villa)
- August-Exter-Straße 30 (Villa), Semi-detached house with Nr. 28 (not a single monument)
- August-Exter-Straße 32 (Villa)
- August-Exter-Straße 34 (Villa)
- August-Exter-Straße 36 (Villa)
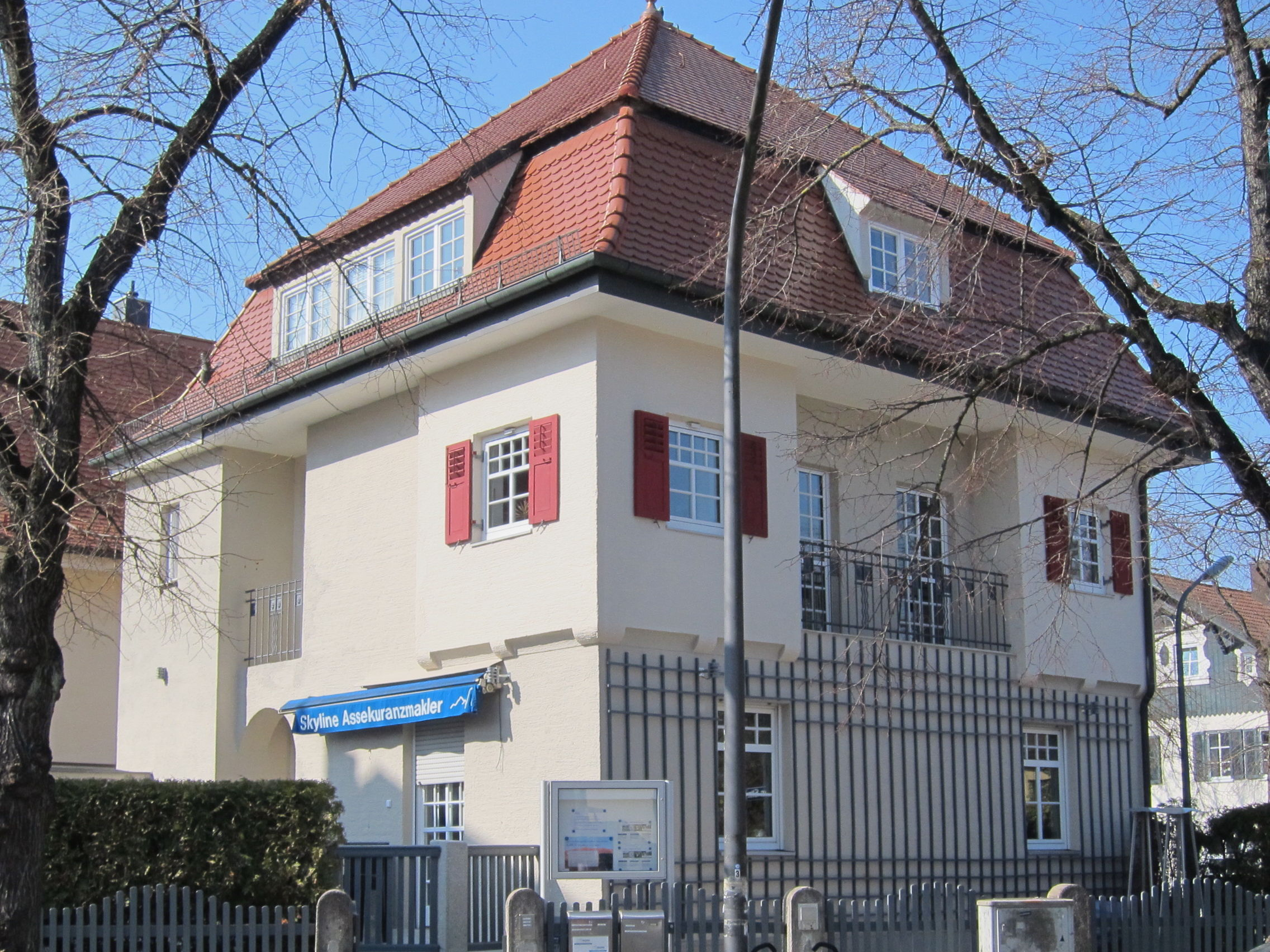
Villa August-Exter-Straße 9

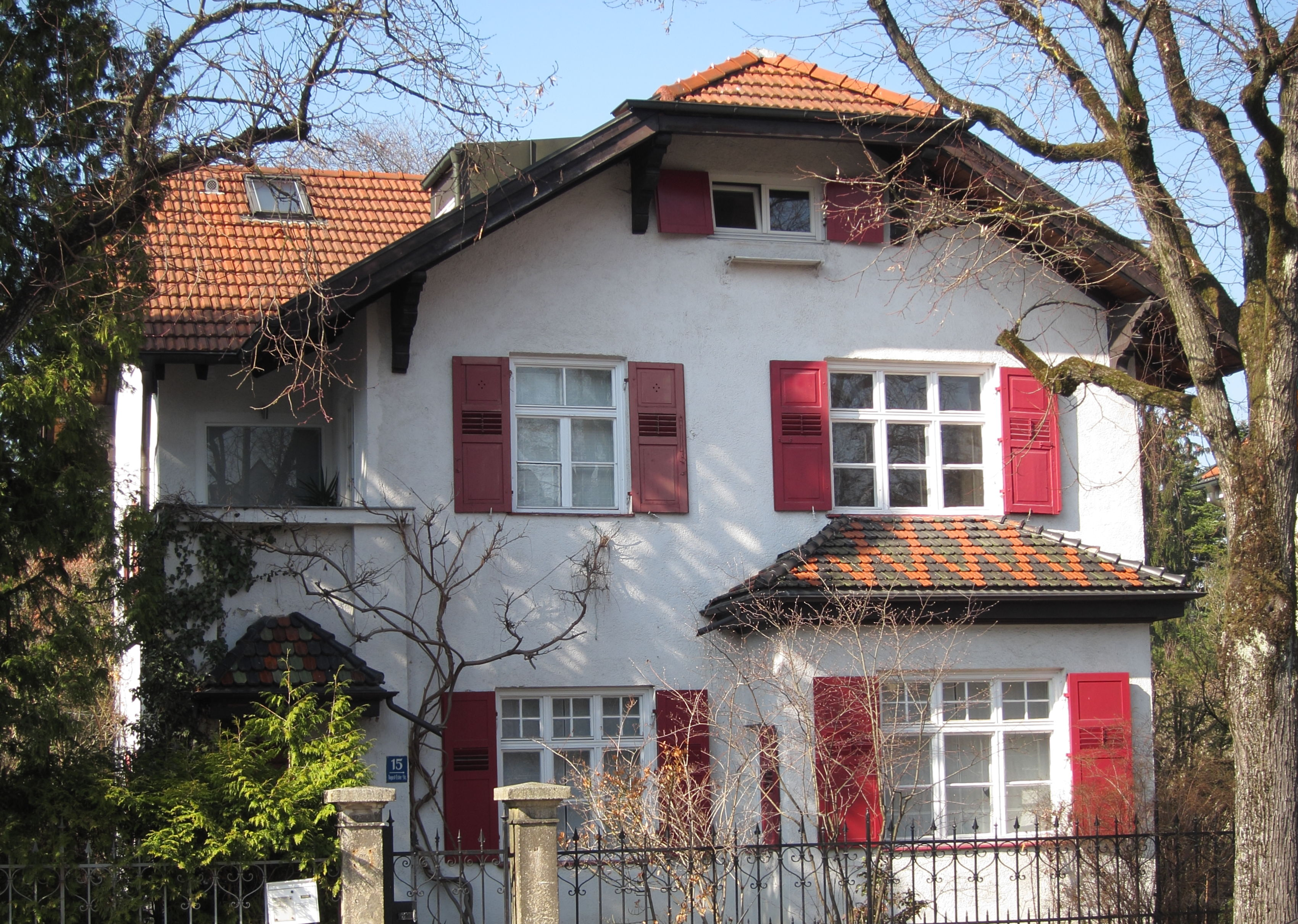
Villa August-Exter-Straße 15

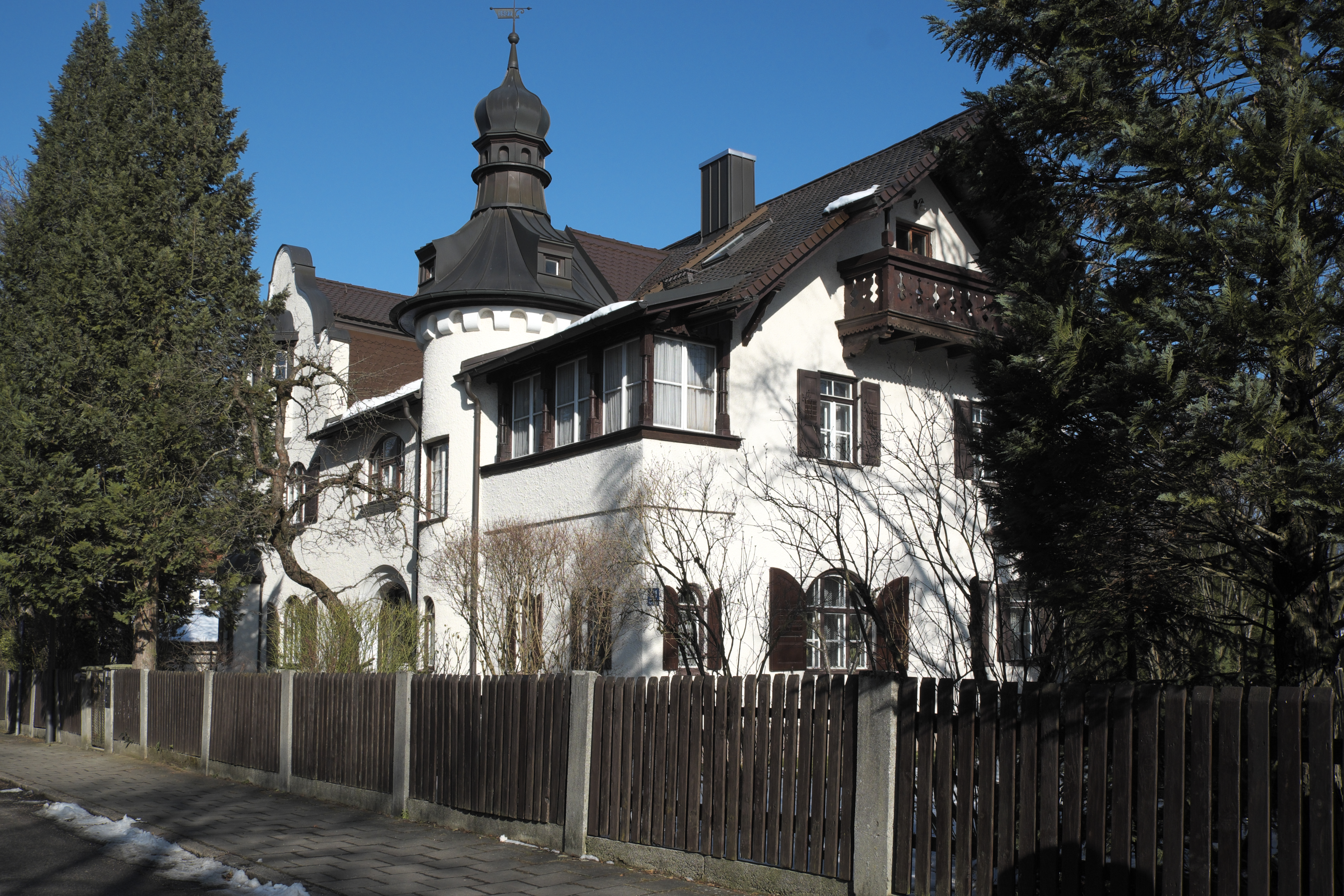
Villa August-Exter-Straße 21

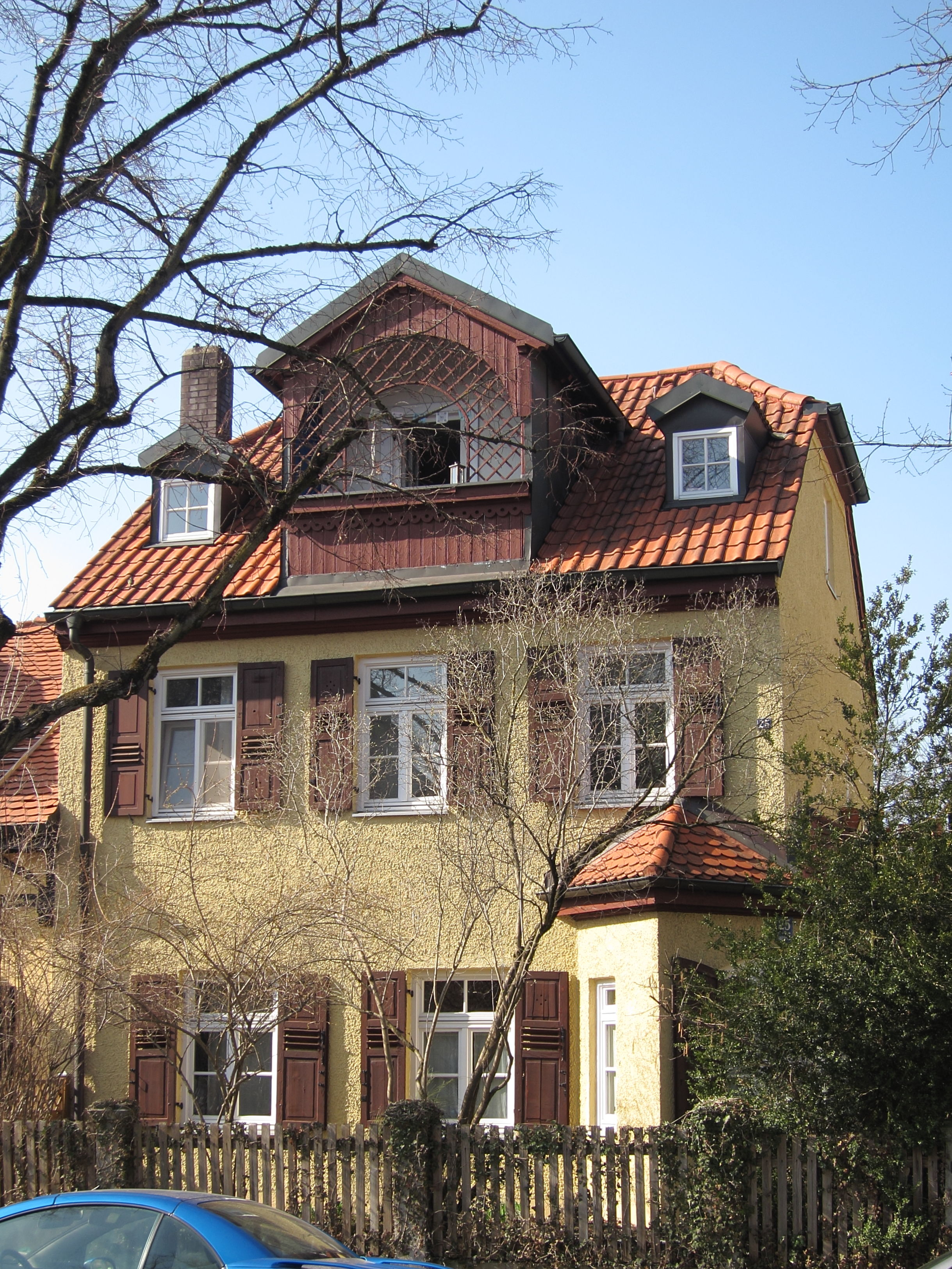
Villa August-Exter-Straße 25

== Literature ==
Chevalley, Dennis A.; Weski, Timm (2004). Denkmäler in Bayern (in German). Munich: Lipp Verlag. p. 75. ISBN 3-87490-584-5.
