= Herz-Jesu-Kirche, Munich =

Church in Munich, Germany

Herz-Jesu-Kirche
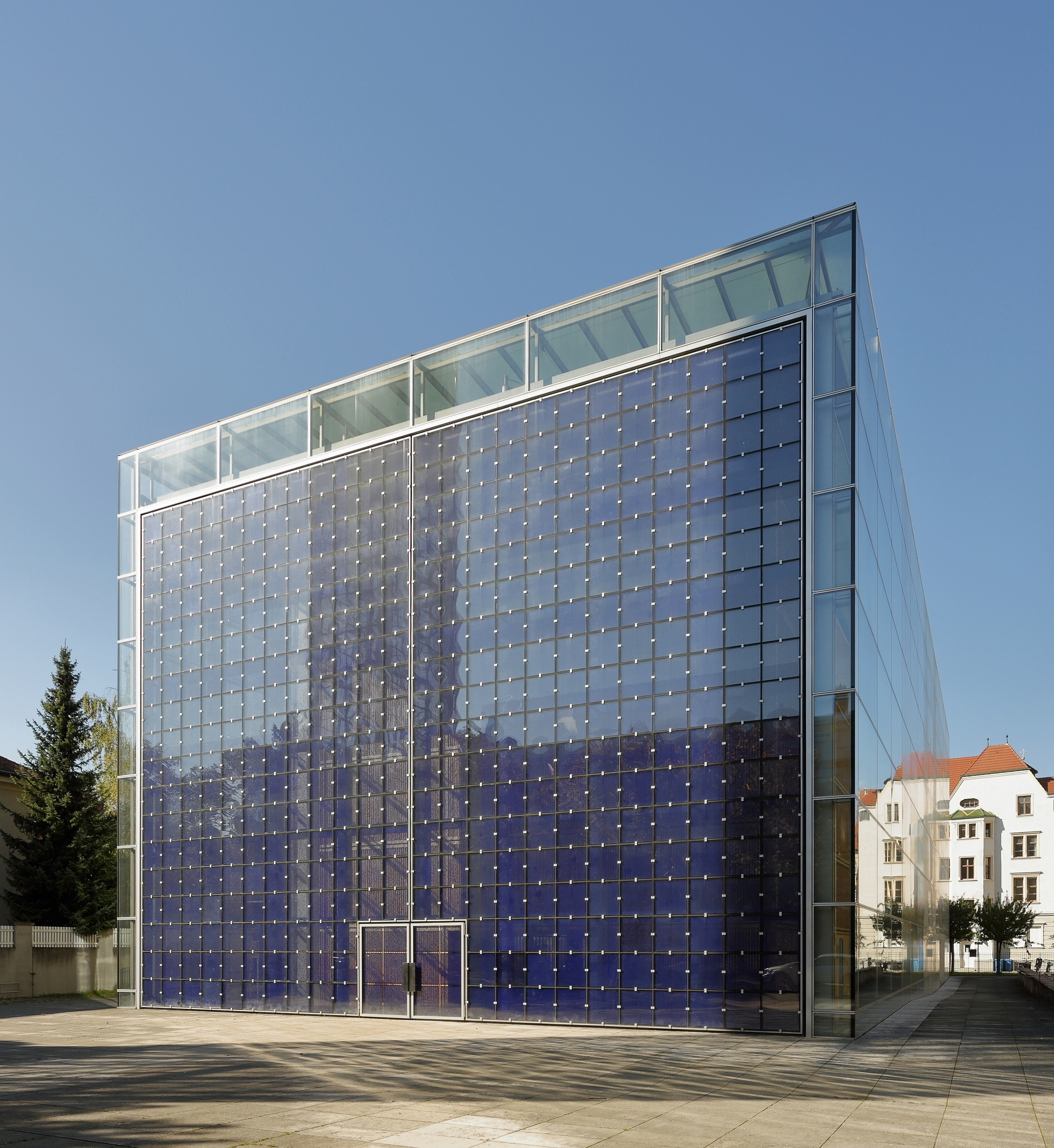
- Herz Jesu Church in 2014

- 48°09′23″N 11°31′43″E
- Location: Munich
- Address: Lachnerstraße 8
- Country: Germany
- Denomination: Catholic
- Website: www.erzbistum-muenchen.de/pfarrei/herz-jesu-muenchen/

History
- Status: church
- Dedication: Sacred Heart

Administration
- Diocese: Archdiocese of Munich and Freising

Herz-Jesu-Kirche (Sacred Heart Church) is a Catholic Church at Lachnerstraße 8 in the Neuhausen-Nymphenburg borough of Munich, Bavaria, Germany. There has been a church on the site since 1890, but the current (and third) church was built between 1997 and 2000 to plans by architects Allmann Sattler Wappner. It is part of the Archdiocese of Munich and Freising.

== History ==
The first church on the site was consecrated in 1890. It was designed by architect Johann Marggraff, who used the wooden structure of a former festival hall in the construction of the church building. The church was dedicated to the Assumption of Mary until 1936, when archbishop Michael von Faulhaber dedicated it to the Sacred Heart of Jesus.

On 12 July 1944, the first church was greatly damaged in an Allied bombing raid, and it was subsequently redesigned and reconstructed by architect Friedrich Haindl in the years from 1948 to 1951. In doing so, he utilised the former cinema of the SS troops responsible for guarding Hitler’s Berghof residence at Obersalzberg in the Bavarian Alps.

On 25 and 26 November 1994, the second church was completely destroyed by a fire. The archdiocese’s call for a new church design resulted in 158 submissions, and the architects Allmann Sattler Wappner won the competition. Reconstruction of the church started in 1997, ended in 2000, and cost €16m. On 26 November 2000, Cardinal Friedrich Wetter consecrated the third church in his role as Archbishop of Munich and Freising.

== Building ==
The church building consists of a rectangular glass box which is 16 metres (52 ft) high, 21 metres (69 ft) wide, and 48 metres (157 ft) long. The glass structure is supported by a steel frame. On special occasions, the front of the glass box can be fully opened as a pair of double-winged doors, reportedly forming the largest set of church doors in the world. When the main doors are closed, access is provided through two smaller doors integrated into the entrance.

Within the glass structure stands a second, wooden box that forms the main worship space. The outer glass walls vary from transparent at the front to opaque near the altar. The inner wooden walls are made of slatted maple and oak panels, and the angle at which the slats are positioned also varies from front to back, becoming more open as they approach the altar. Natural light enters through the slats, with its intensity varying according to the position of the sun.

Between the walls of the two boxes is a walkway that provides for the stations of the cross. Inside the wooden box, at the front of the church, is a third, concrete box which houses the organ and provides space for an orchestra. Visitors enter the worship space through a low area beneath the organ gallery. Beyond this, the floor slopes down toward the altar.

A large, limestone surfaced, square separates the main façade from the tree-lined Lachnerstraße, an otherwise unassuming street. The limestone paving continues into the church without any obvious threshold when the large doors are open. The free-standing campanile stands on the street side of the square, and is a metallic structure measuring 37 metres (121 ft) in height.

== Gallery ==
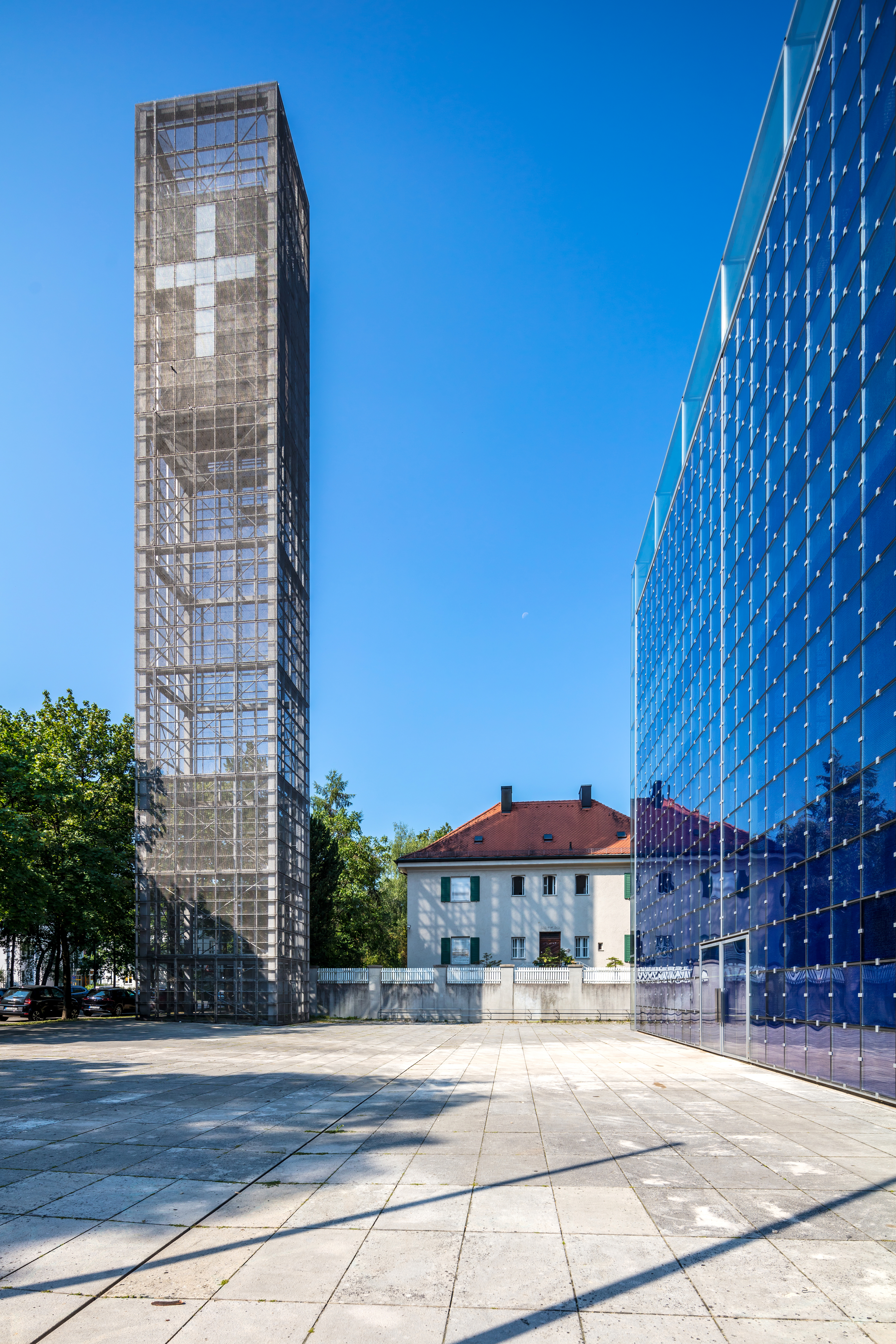
Square and campanile

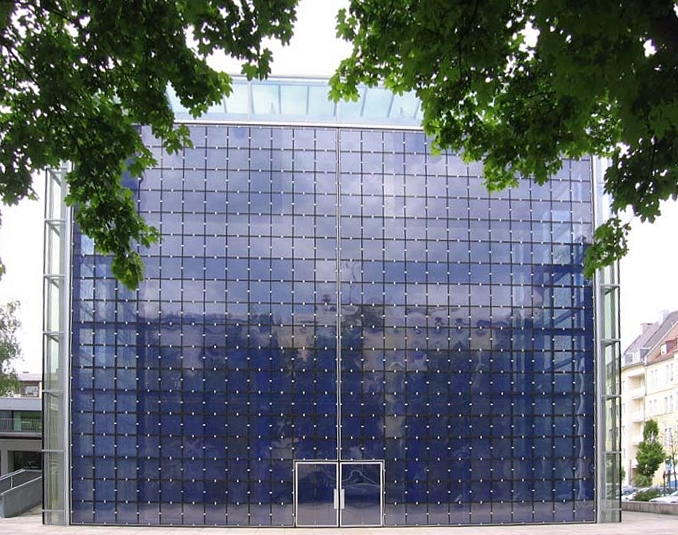
Doors closed

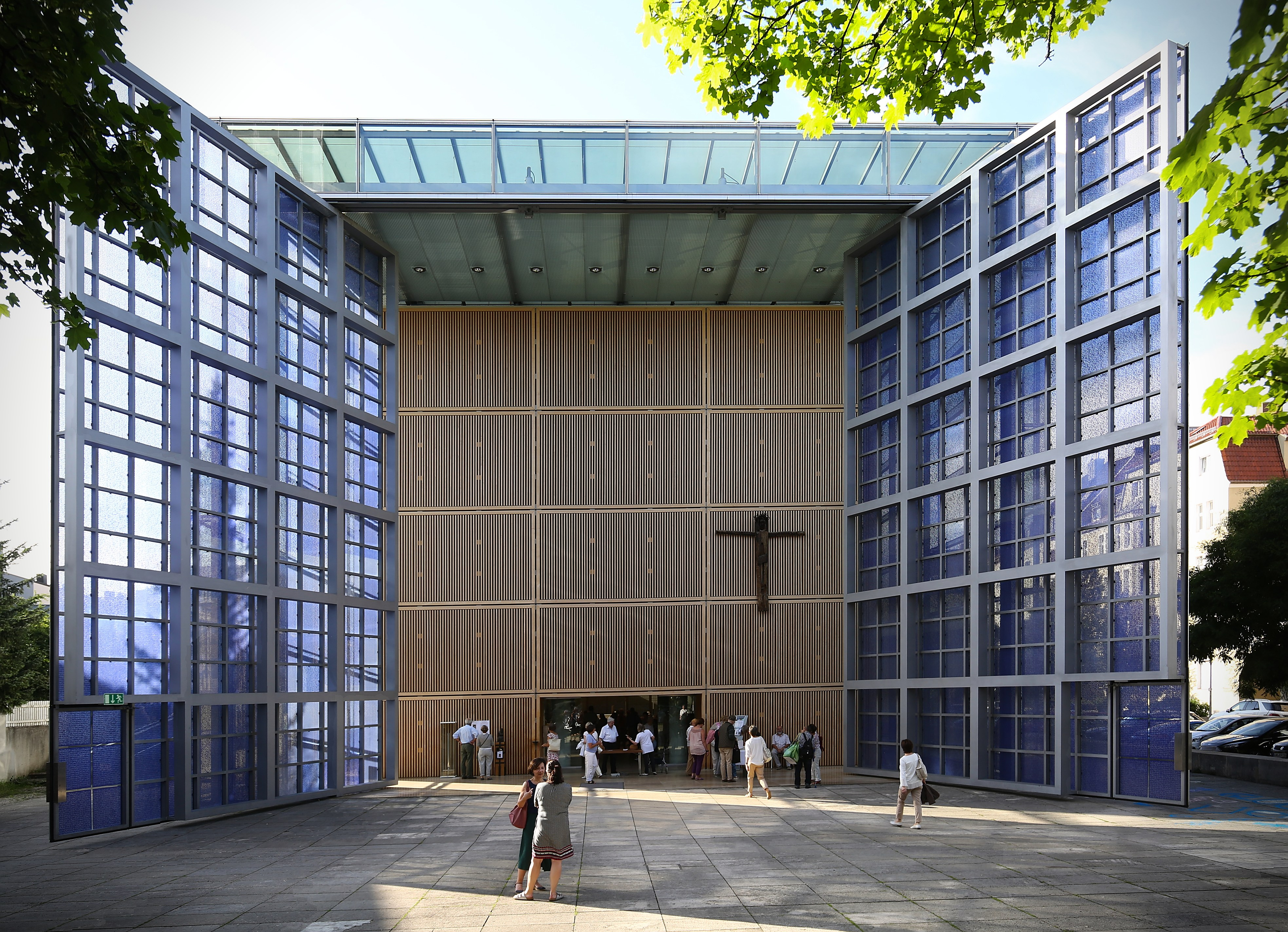
Doors open

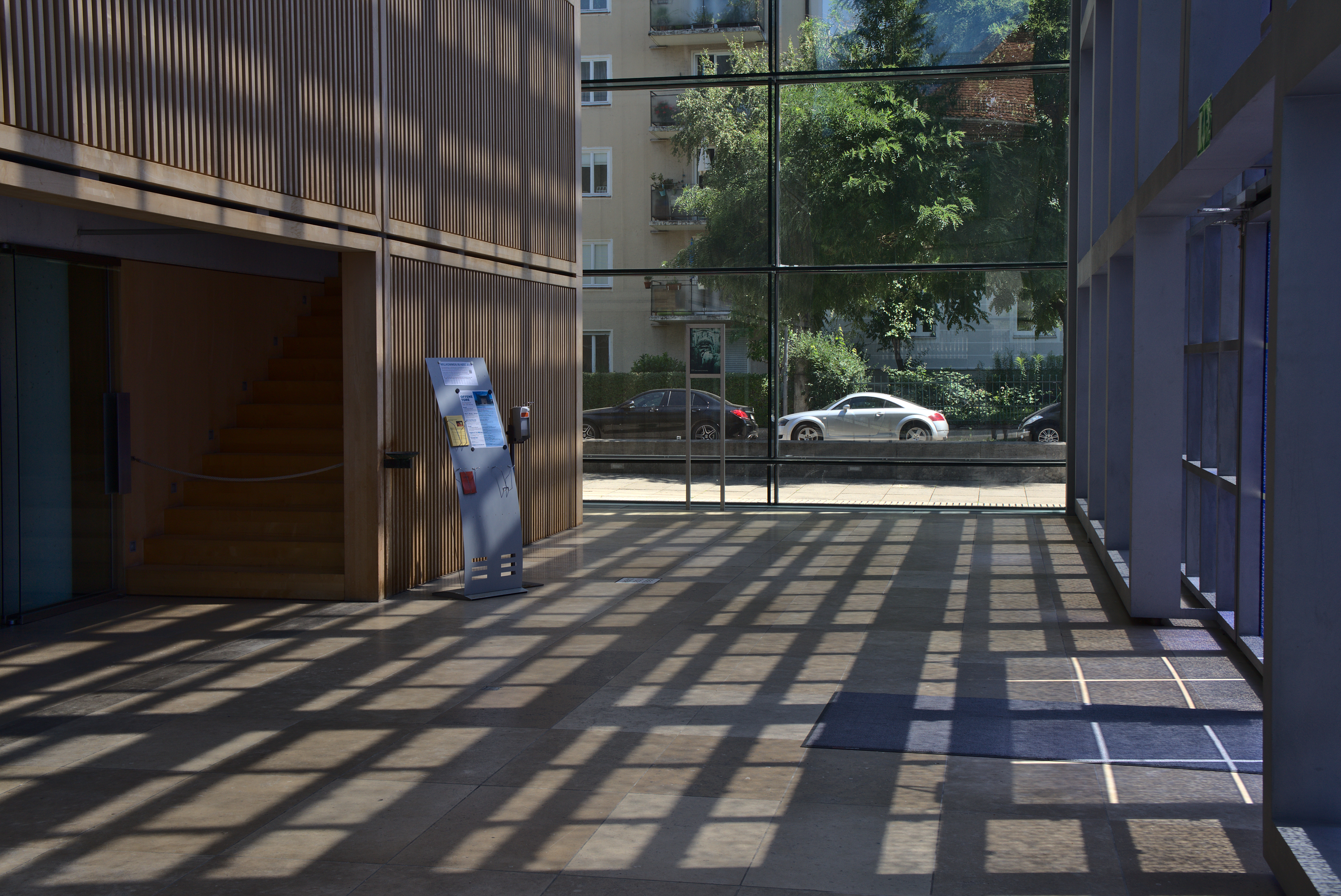
Space between

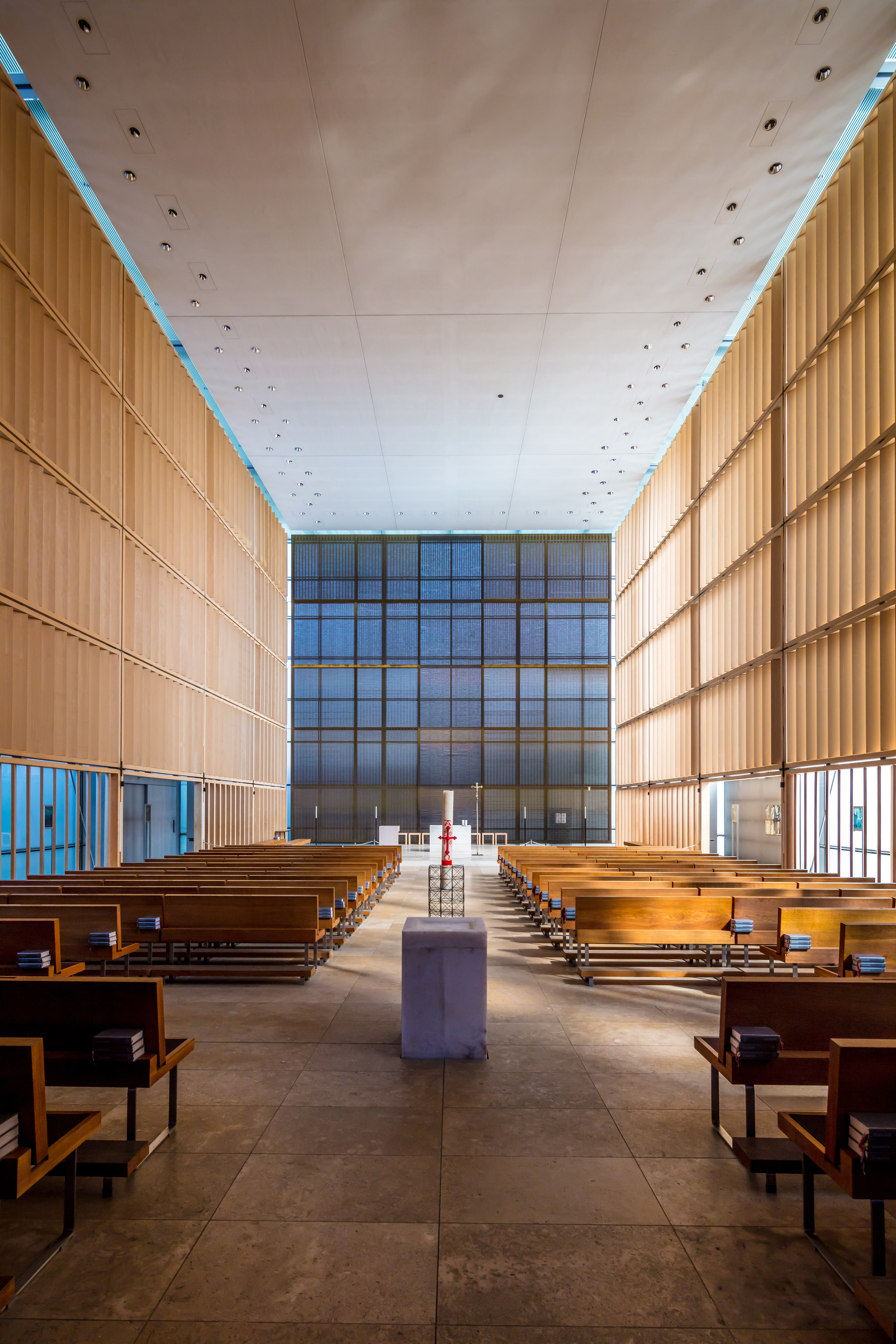
Interior
