= Haus der Gegenwart =

Coordinates: 48°07′42″N 11°41′51″E

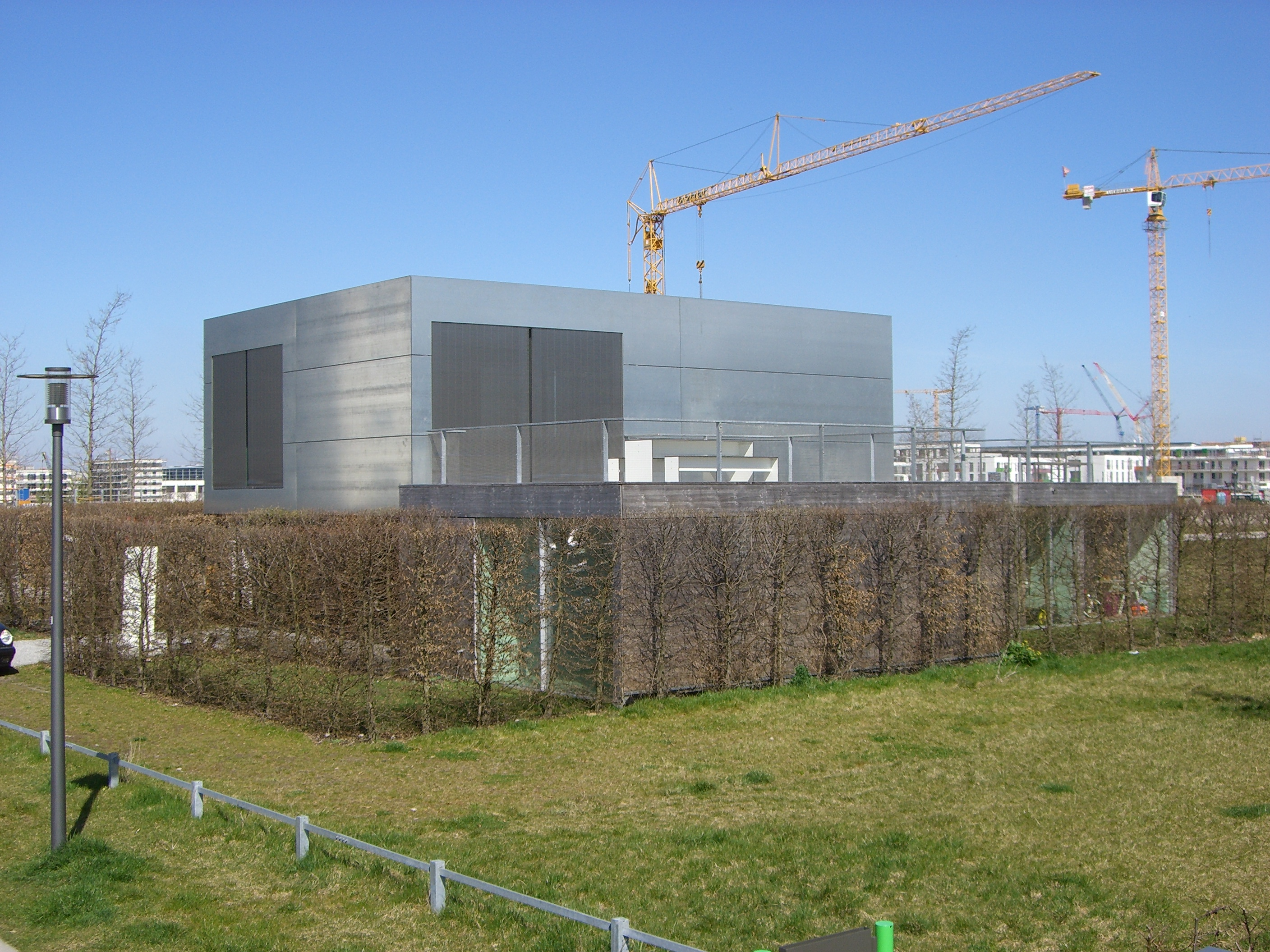
Haus der Gegenwart

Haus der Gegenwart is located in Munich, Bavaria, Germany.
