= Pasing Arcaden =

Coordinates: 48°08′55″N 11°27′48″E

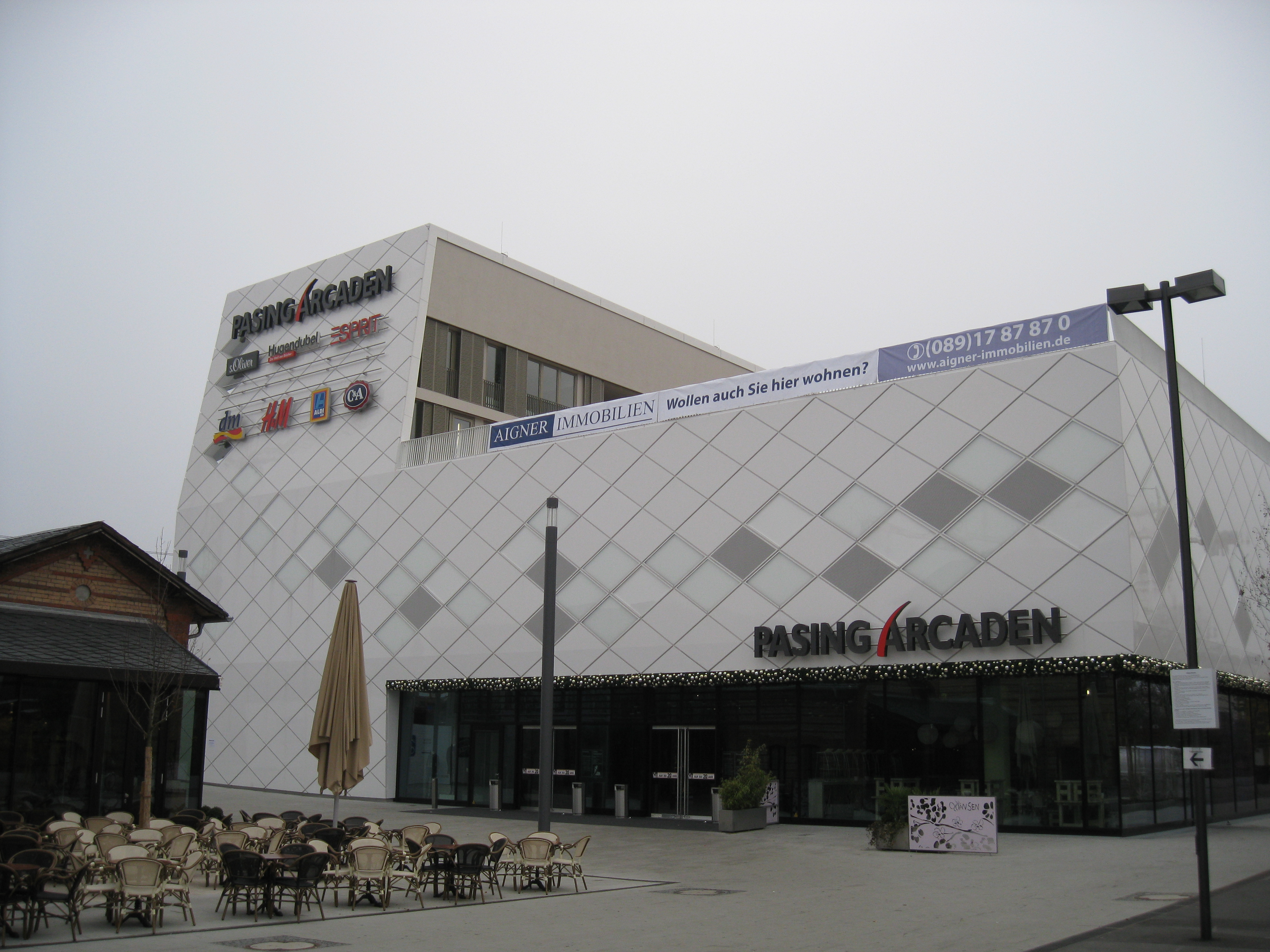
- Location: Pasing, Munich, Germany
- Address: Josef-Felder-Street 53, 81241 Munich
- Opened: 15 March 2011
- Developer: mfi Management für Immobilien
- Owner: INGKA Centres
- Architect: Allmann Sattler Wappner
- Num. of stores: 150
- Floor area: 63,000 m^{2}
- Floors: 3
- Parking: 1,000
- Website: www.pasing-arcaden.de

The Pasing Arcaden is a shopping mall located in Munich's district of Pasing. The first section of the Pasing Arcaden was opened on the 15 of March 2011. It is located near the Pasing train station, in the west of Munich.

The main entrance at the Pasing train station square opens up to the 270 meter long first section of the shopping area. This portion of the complex has a total area of 26,000 m^{2} and offers 14,000 m^{2} of space for 90 shops and boutiques. On 18 February 2013, the second section of Pasing Arcaden with an additional 50 shops and 11 catering establishments covering an area of 37,000 m^{2} was opened. Giovanni Trapattoni was the star guest at the opening.

The total area of the Pasing Arcaden covers 63,000 m^{2}, in which the total commercial area covers 39,000 m^{2}. Making the Pasing Arcaden the fourth major shopping mall in Munich, after the Einkaufs-Center Neuperlach – pep, the Olympia-Einkaufszentrum, and the Riem Arcaden.

The building was designed by the Munich architecture office of Allmann Sattler Wappner. The floor plan was designed similar to that of a cruise ship. The façade was designed with diamonds made of metal. The side of the building, adjacent to the railway tracks from Pasing to München Hauptbahnhof, is slightly curved, and the building height is more than 20 meters. The opposite longitudinal side of the building is approximately 10 meters high. The reason for this being the 45 three-to-five room apartments that were built in diagonal blocks on the roof of the Pasing Arcaden. Between the apartment blocks are large terraces that are available to the tenants. Additional commercial area has been planned.

The walkways inside the shopping area do not run straight, but intertwine throughout the building. The shop facades are designed by the tenants themselves. Under the complex is a two-story underground parking area with 660 parking spaces.

The management behind the Pasing Arcaden is the same as that for the Riem Arcaden, mfi Management für Immobilien AG, Essen. The first phase of construction costed a total of €190 million. The project schedule was delayed as a lawsuit with a neighbor interrupted construction works between 2008 and 2009.

In 2024, Unibail-Rodamco-Westfield sold the centre to INGKA Centres, a division of INGKA Holding.
