= Pasing =

District in Munich, Germany

Coordinates: 48°09′N 11°27′E

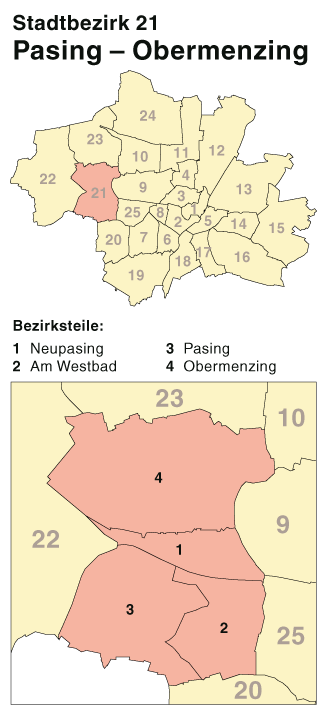
District map

Pasing (German pronunciation: [ˈpaːzɪŋ]) is a district in the city of Munich, Germany, and part of the borough Pasing-Obermenzing.

== Overview ==
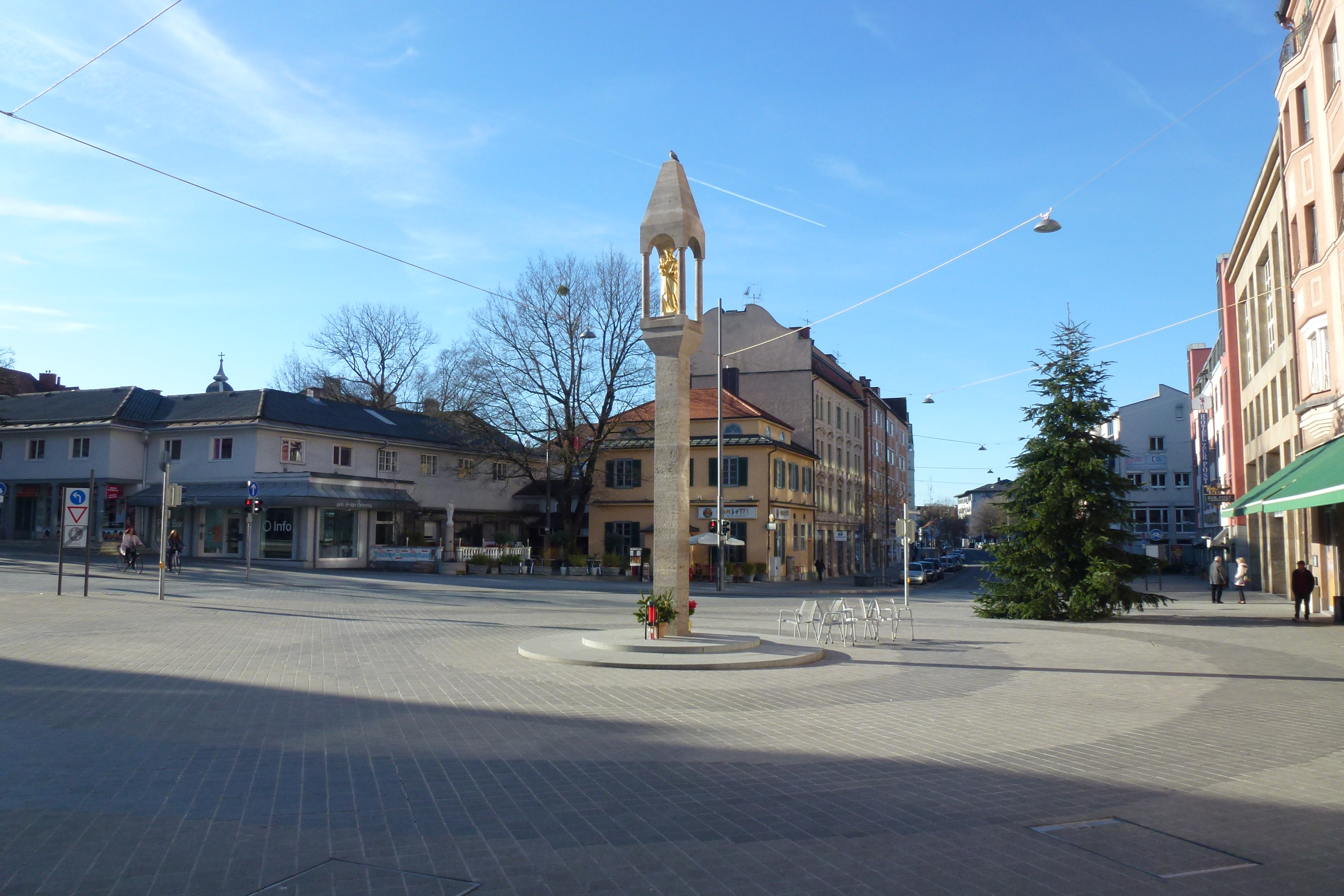
Pasinger Marienplatz

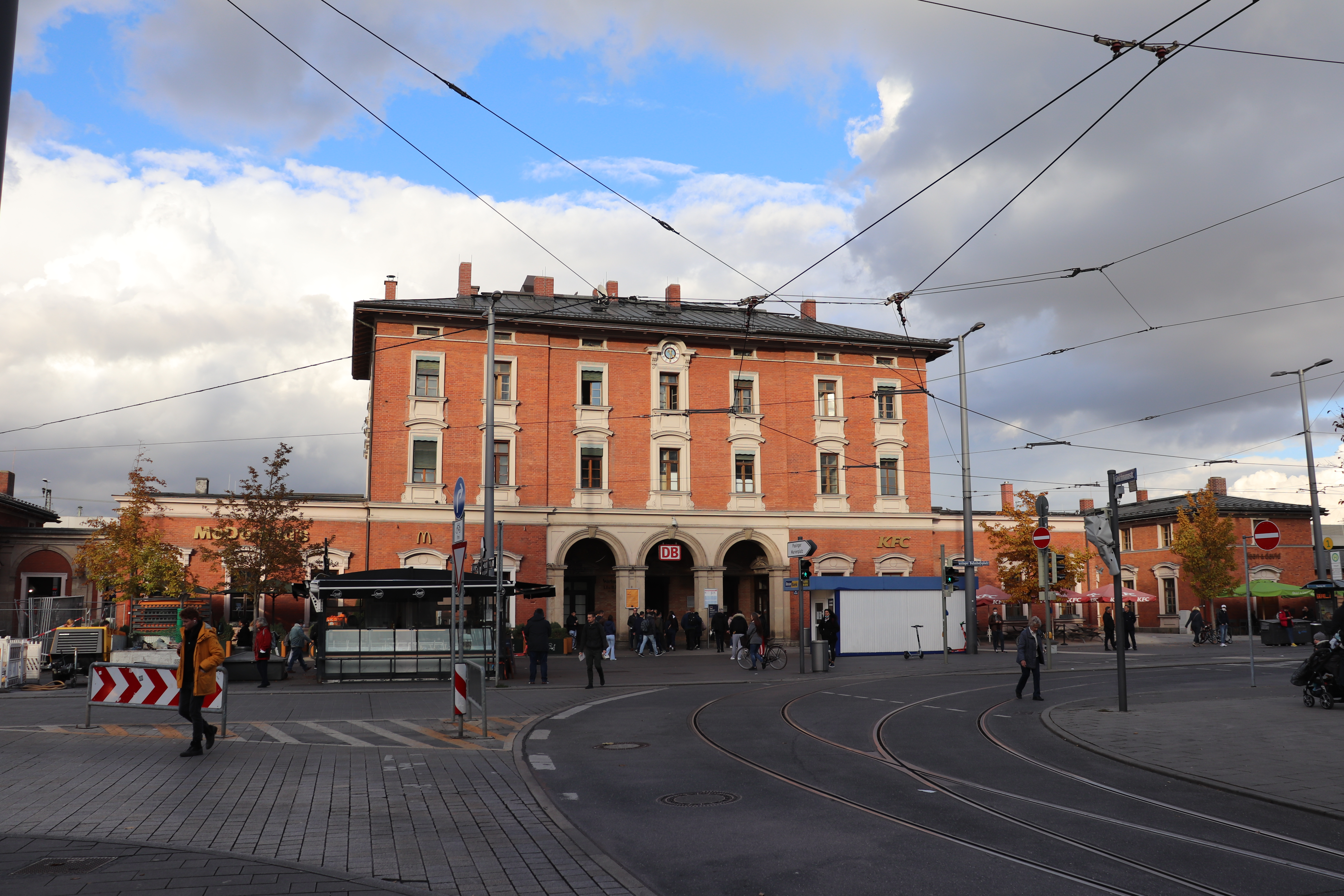
Pasing railway station.

Pasing is located west of the Munich city centre, at the north-western edge of the city's innermost traffic zone. The district is mainly residential; there is a large concentration of shops, hotels and restaurant at the Pasinger Marienplatz (Pasing St. Mary Square), the quarter's main square. The quarter's railway station, Pasing Station, is served by the S-Bahn suburban trains 3, 4, 6, 8 and 20 as well as national and international trains services. Tram line 19 and several local bus lines terminate at the station.

The Pasinger Stadtpark (Pasing City Park) is the quarter's main recreational park. It is located south of Pasing Marienplatz, straddling the river Würm. Nearby, a branch of the Munich University of Applied Sciences is located.

== Population ==
On December 31, 1991, Pasing had a population of 39,723 residents across an area of 4.15 square miles (1,074 hectares). By December 31, 1999, the population had decreased to 35,752. Since then, no independent survey has been conducted as Pasing is now surveyed together with Obermenzing.

== Economy ==
Pasing is characterized by a balanced economic structure. The distribution of the 21,000 jobs in the manufacturing industry, trade, transport and other sectors of the economy is uniform. An emphasis on a commercial area does not exist. In addition to the wide variety in the village shopping center Pasing Arcaden exists.

== Notable people ==
- Alois Wunder (1878–1974), only Oberbürgermeister of Pasing
- Hans Nimmerfall (1872–1934), politician
- Felix Neureuther (born 1984), World Cup alpine ski racer
- Michael Ende (1929–1995) important author of children's books.
- Ferdinand Keller (1946–2023), footballer.

== See also ==
- Pasing Arcaden
- Munich Pasing station
- August-Exter-Straße
- Pasinger Fabrik
- Nordumgehung Pasing
