= Messe München =

German venue

Messe München GmbH
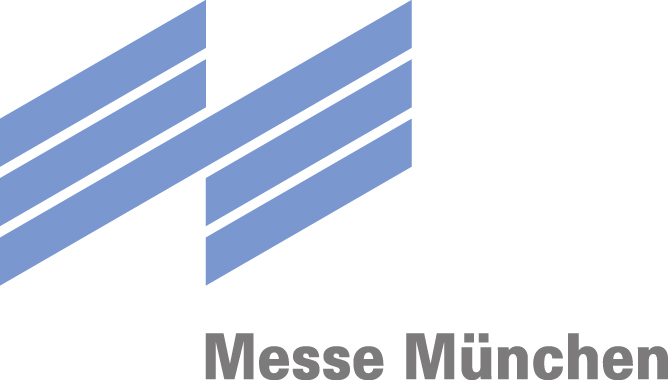
- Type: GmbH
- Industry: Exhibition industry
- Founded: 1 April 1964 in Munich, Germany
- Headquarters: Munich, Germany,
- Key people: Dr. Reinhard Pfeiffer and Stefan Rummel, chairmen and CEOs
- Revenue: Messe München GmbH: 230.2 million euro; Group: 277.4 million euro
- Number of employees: Messe München GmbH: 656; Group: 968
- Website: www.messe-muenchen.de/en/

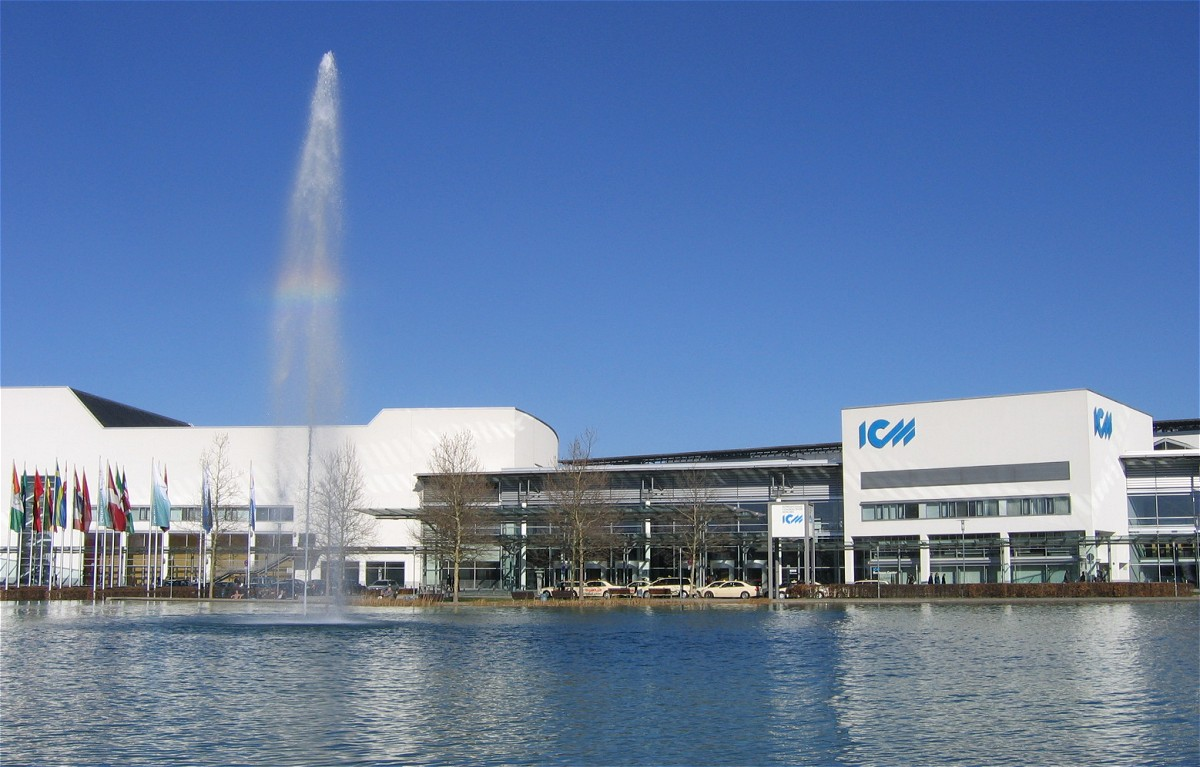
International Congress Center Munich

Messe München GmbH is the operator of the Neue Messe München exhibition center, the ICM Internationales Congress Center München and the MOC Veranstaltungscenter München. The exhibition space of the 18 halls together is 200,000 m^{2} and another 414,000 m^{2} of outdoor area, making Messe München by far the holder of the largest outdoor area of all exhibition companies in Germany. Messe München organizes and participates some 16 trade fairs for capital and consumer goods and key high-tech industries in Munich and Germany and another 47 abroad.

== Overview ==
Partners of Messe München are the Free State of Bavaria and the City of Munich. Chairmen of the board are Dr. Reinhard Pfeiffer and Stefan Rummel. In the exhibition area there are exhibition rooms, the exhibition hall, exhibition tower and the International Congress Centre Munich (ICM). The architects were BBP Arkitekter, Kaup, Scholz, and Jesse + Partner.

Messe München is a member of the AUMA, FKM, GDG, UFI, and CEFA trade associations.

They moved the fair from the city center to the former airport site in Messestadt Riem which allowed the exhibition companies, along with the Neue Messe Munich, to have a modern and sustainable trade fair complex. It has been certified as an energy-efficient company by TÜV Süd, with a Photovoltaic roof system and an energy concept saving more than 8,000 tons of CO_{2} annually. The entire exhibition center is heated with renewable energy through a geothermal system from Stadtwerke München.

The Messe München trade-fair center, the ICM Internationales Congress Center München and the MOC Veranstaltungscenter München are available for conferences, meetings and small events.

In 2024, Messe München GmbH generates group sales of €488 million and an net income of €70 million. A total of 2,5 million visitors participated in Messe München events in Germany and abroad in 2024.

== Events ==
The most visited event at the Munich Trade Fair Center is the construction fair bauma, also the world's geographically largest fair, which takes place every three years and attracted some 605,974 visitors in 2025. Large public exhibitions are the f.re.e, the Heim + Handwerk and the Internationale Handwerksmesse. Important trade fairs include the analytica, automatica, drinktec and BAU. Other exhibitions in Munich are Expo Real, IFAT, intersolar Europe, Laser World of Photonics, Transport Logistic, eCarTec and the yearly alternating productronica and electronica trade fairs.

== History ==
In 1908 the original Exhibition Park opened on the Theresienhöhe located behind the Ruhmeshalle; the fair moved at the end of 1998 to the new center in Munich-Riem.

=== 1972 Summer Olympics ===
In its former location, the Messegelände consisted of twenty buildings located in the greater Munich area. During the 1972 Summer Olympics, five of these venues served as host to the fencing, the fencing part of modern pentathlon, judo, weightlifting, and wrestling events. These were:

- Fencing Hall 1: These two halls, 11 and 12, played host to the fencing competitions for these games. Hall 11 was used as an entrance for spectators, while Hall 12 was a competition area. They hosted the fencing finals.
- Fencing Hall 2: Hall 20 hosted the semifinals of the fencing competitions, along with the fencing part of the modern pentathlon event for the 1972 Games.
- Weightlifting Hall: Hall 7 hosted the weightlifting competitions during the 1972 Games.
- Judo and Wrestling Hall: Hall 14, the only one that was newly built, hosted the judo and wrestling competitions.
