= Electronica (disambiguation) =

Electronica is an umbrella term that encompasses a broad group of electronic-based styles.

Electronica may also refer to:

- Electronica (trade fair), a trade fair for the electronics industry
- ElecTRONica, a nighttime event at Disney California Adventure
- Two albums by Jean-Michel Jarre:
  - Electronica 1: The Time Machine
  - Electronica 2: The Heart of Noise
