= Trudering =

City quarter in Munich, Germany

Coordinates: 48°07′00″N 11°39′30″E

Trudering (Central Bavarian: Trudaring) is one of two quarters (German: Stadtteile) forming the Trudering-Riem borough of Munich, the other one being Riem. It is primarily residential, offering access to U-Bahn and S-Bahn services at the München Trudering railway station. The main traffic artery B304 (Wasserburger Landstraße) connects the quarter with the city centre and Wasserburg am Inn.

Out of the eight sub-districts of the greater Trudering-Riem borough (German: Stadtbezirk), Trudering consists of six sub-divisions: Am Moosfeld, Gartenstadt Trudering, Kirchtrudering, Neutrudering, Straßtrudering, and Waldtrudering. The other quarter, Riem, contains the Messestadt Riem and Riem sub-districts.

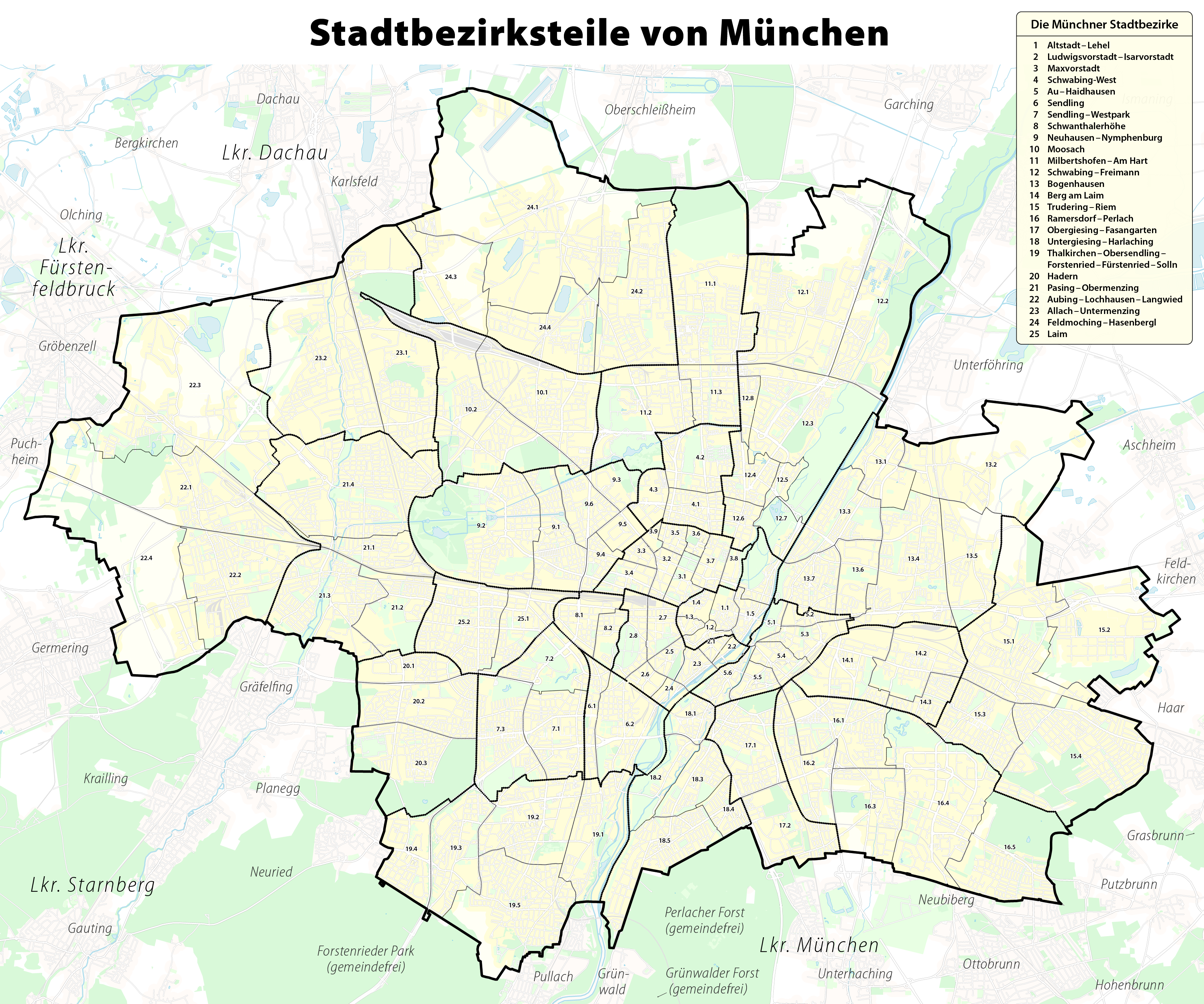
Map of the Munich boroughs (German: Stadtbezirke). Trudering comprises quarters (German: Stadtteile) 15.3, 15.4, and the southern parts of 15.1.
