= Expo Real =

Trade fair for real estate and investment located in Europe

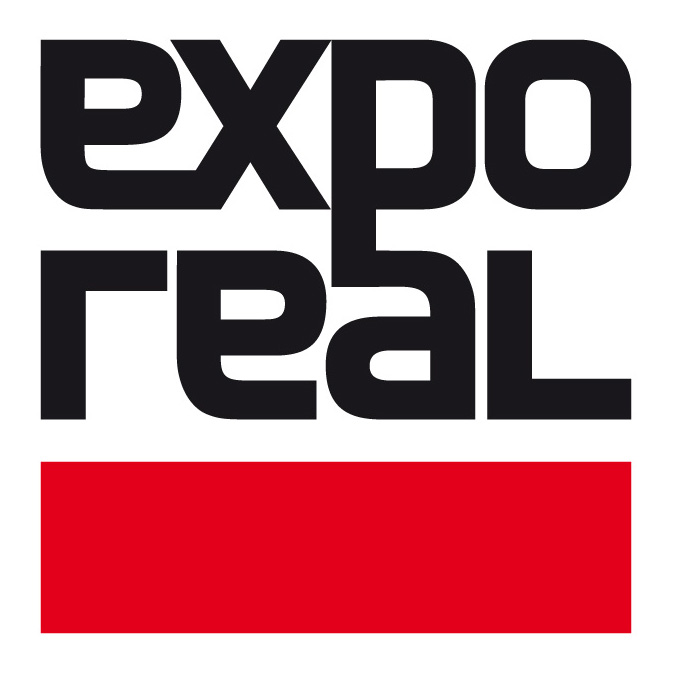
Logo of Expo Real

Expo Real (written EXPO REAL) is a trade fair for real estate and investment in Europe. Since 1998 it has been organized by Messe München GmbH in the grounds of Messe München every year. Expo Real is Europe's biggest B2B trade fair.

In 2019, Expo Real covered an exhibition area of 72,250 square meters. There were 46,747 participants from 77 countries, including 24,682 representatives from 2,190 exhibiting companies.

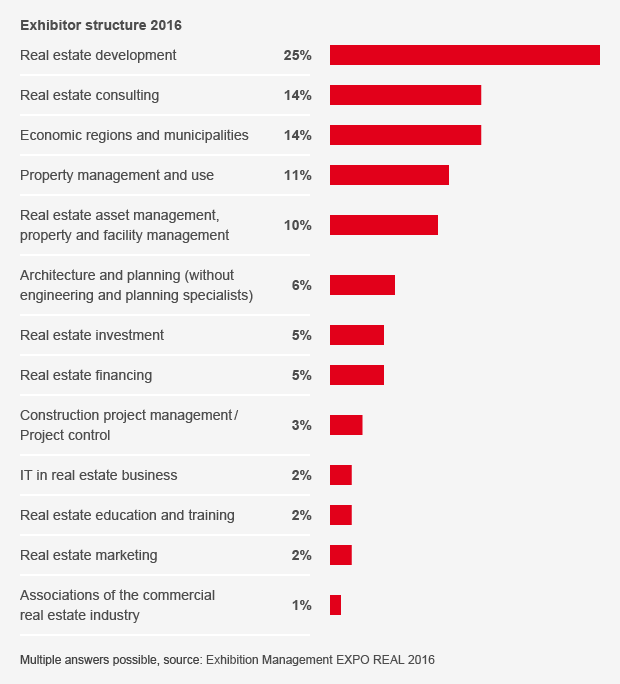
Expo Real exhibitor structure 2016 (source: Exhibition Management EXPO REAL 2016

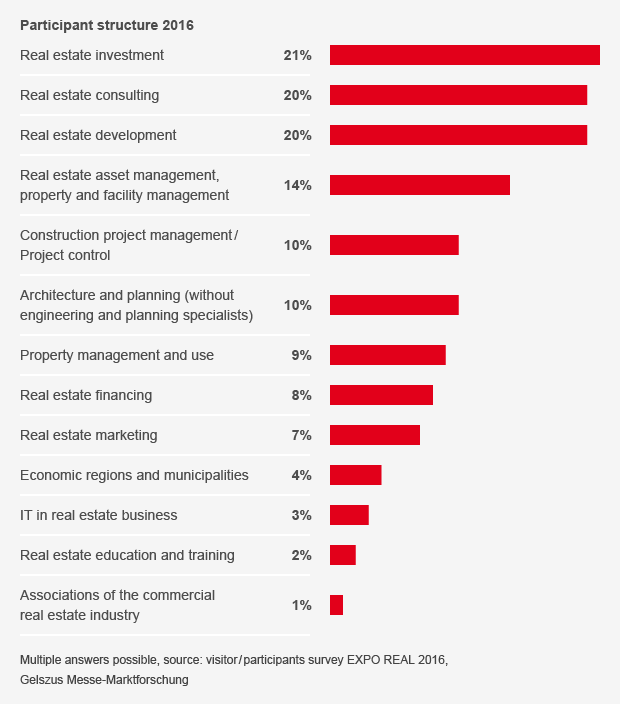
Expo Real visitor structure 2016 (source: visitors'/participants' survey Expo Real 2016, Gelszus Messe-Marktforschung)

The fair offers an international networking platform to initiate business, present and initiate projects and make new contacts. The participants come from Europe and abroad. At Expo Real 2019, representatives from Belfast, Porto and Copenhagen, and countrywide representation from Malta and Lebanon attended for the first time.

The international conference program hosts about 400 speakers and provides an overview of the latest topics, trends and innovations in the industry as well as topical economic and political issues. In 2019, there was a series of panels on Brexit, coworking, the state of proptech, the future of urban planning and climate-friendly development. Another topic was affordable housing, where measures on rent caps and increasing the density of development in urban areas were discussed. Participants can obtain information in a separate exhibition area as well as from presentations and panel discussions of the supporting conference program.

Joint stands focusing on asset classes have also been established: for the logistics properties the "LogRealCampus", for hotel properties the "World of Hospitality". In 2019, the new NOVA3 hall, focusing on how proptech can benefit the sector, was introduced.
