= Transport Logistic =

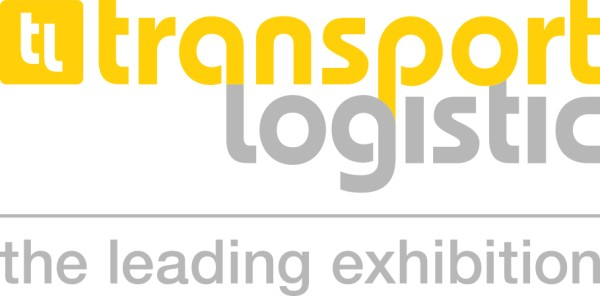
transport logistic Logo

transport logistic is the world´s biggest trade show for logistics, mobility, IT and supply chain management. It takes place every two years in early May, at the Neue Messe München in Munich. The organizer is Messe München.

Integrated within the framework of transport logistic are also Air Cargo Europe, an international trade conference and exhibition for the air cargo business, and marilog, an international conference on maritime logistics. In 2019 transport logistic was held on around 125,000 m^{2} of exhibition space. It attracted 64.000 visitors from 125 countries, and 2374 exhibiting companies from 63 countries.

== transport logistic China ==
In even-numbered years, transport logistic in Munich is supplemented by a sister event in Asia: transport logistic China. This show, covering the same themes as the Munich event and also organized by Messe München International, takes place in the Shanghai New International Expo Centre in Shanghai.
