= Bauma (trade fair) =

World's largest trade fair in the construction industry

Coordinates: 48.1355°N 11.6986°E

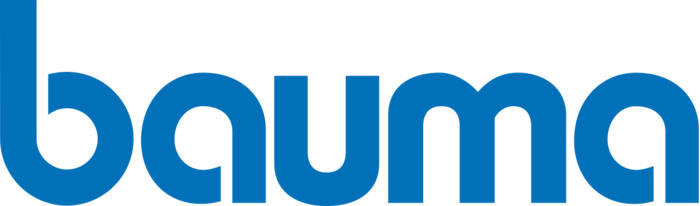
- Status: Active
- Genre: Construction industry trade fair
- Frequency: Triennial
- Venue: Neue Messe München
- Locations: Munich, Germany
- Country: Germany
- Years active: 1954–present
- Inaugurated: 1954
- Attendance: 600,000 (2025)
- Organiser: Messe München

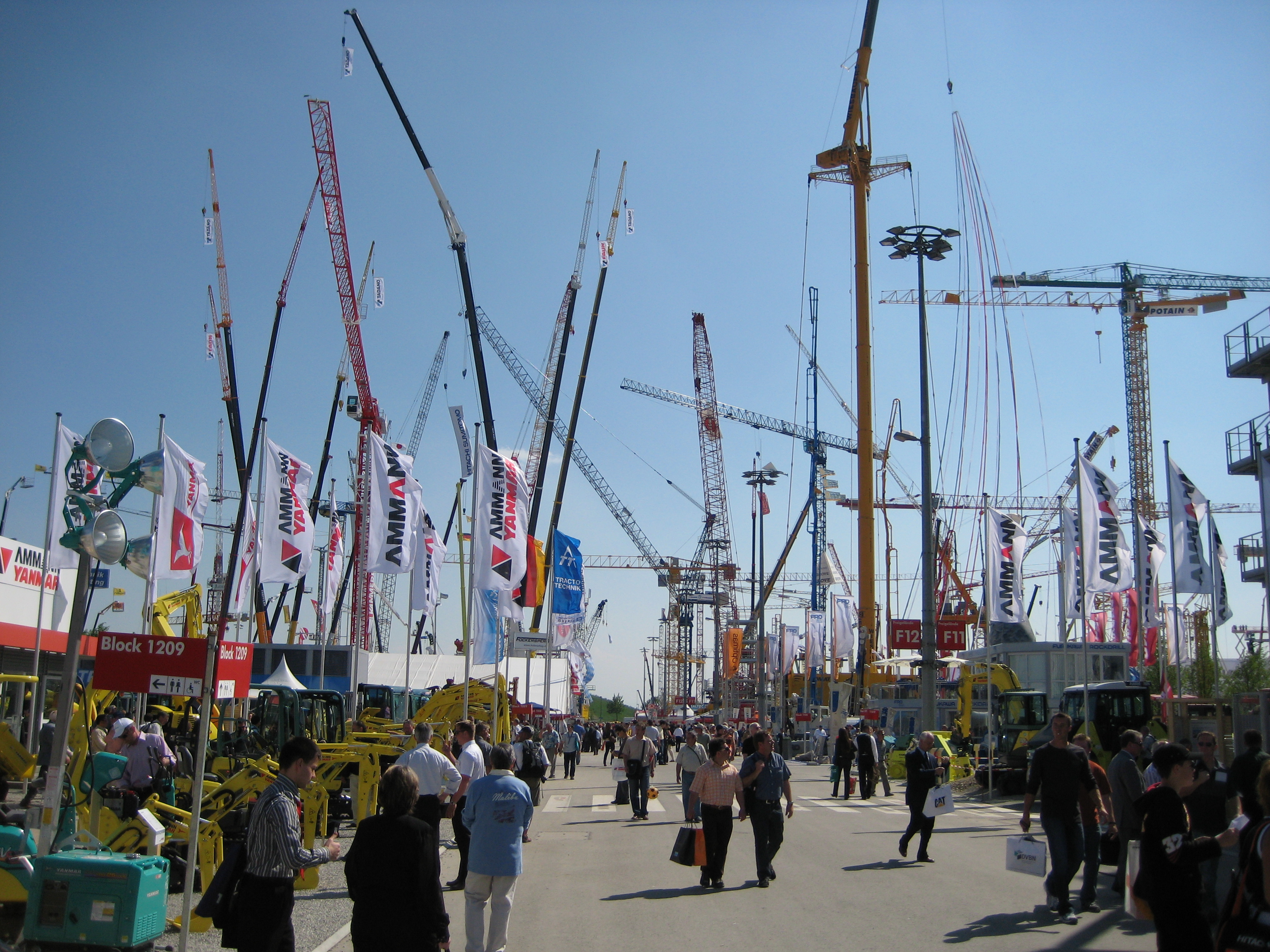
Bauma trade fair (2007)

Bauma (International Trade Fair for Construction Machinery, Building Material Machines, Mining Machines, Construction Vehicles and Construction Equipment) is the world's largest trade fair in the construction industry. The trade fair, open to the public, is held every three years on the grounds of the Neue Messe München and lasts for seven days. Its organiser is Messe München.

== History ==
The first exhibition took place in 1954 as part of the “Baumusterschau” at Theresienhöhe in Munich and was then known as the spring show for construction machinery. Fifty-eight exhibitors presented their products on a total gross area of 20,000 m^{2}, attracting around 8,000 visitors. Two years later, the exhibition space had already doubled in size, and the name "Bauma", which is still used today, was introduced. In the early days, the fair was a purely German exhibition. In 1958, the first international exhibitors (numbering 13) participated in Bauma.

Due to the building boom, the exhibition space quickly became too small, and the fair was relocated for the first time. In 1962, Bauma opened its doors on a former airport site in Oberwiesenfeld, offering 100,000 m^{2} more space for—in the meantime—more than 450 exhibitors. However, the days of the new location were already numbered: the Olympic Park was built on this site, as Munich had been awarded the 1972 Olympic Games. In 1967, the annual Bauma therefore returned to Theresienhöhe, where it remained for decades.

In 1967, Bauma was transferred from private ownership to Messe München's portfolio, and in 1969, the first Bauma was organised under the leadership of Messe München. Although successful from the start, Bauma then experienced an unprecedented upswing: the award of the Olympic Games turned Munich into the largest construction site in Europe. It brought the construction industry an unprecedented order situation. In 1998, the trade fair company moved from Theresienhöhe to Munich-Riem. Since then, Bauma has also taken place there.

In 2002, Bauma China was launched as the first foreign trade fair within the Bauma network. In the meantime, Bauma China has become the largest capital goods fair in Asia and the second largest construction machinery fair in the world. And meanwhile there is a whole network of bauma trade fairs, including Bauma Conexpo India, Bauma Conexpo Africa, Bauma CTT Russia and M&T Expo.

The 2022 edition of Bauma, initially scheduled for April, was postponed to 24–30 October 2022 due to continued uncertainties related to the COVID-19 pandemic.

In 2025, Bauma exceeded expectations by attracting 600,000 visitors from across the globe, reaffirming its position as the world’s leading construction machinery trade fair.

== Key figures ==
In terms of exhibition space, Bauma is both the largest trade fair in the industry and the biggest trade show in the world.

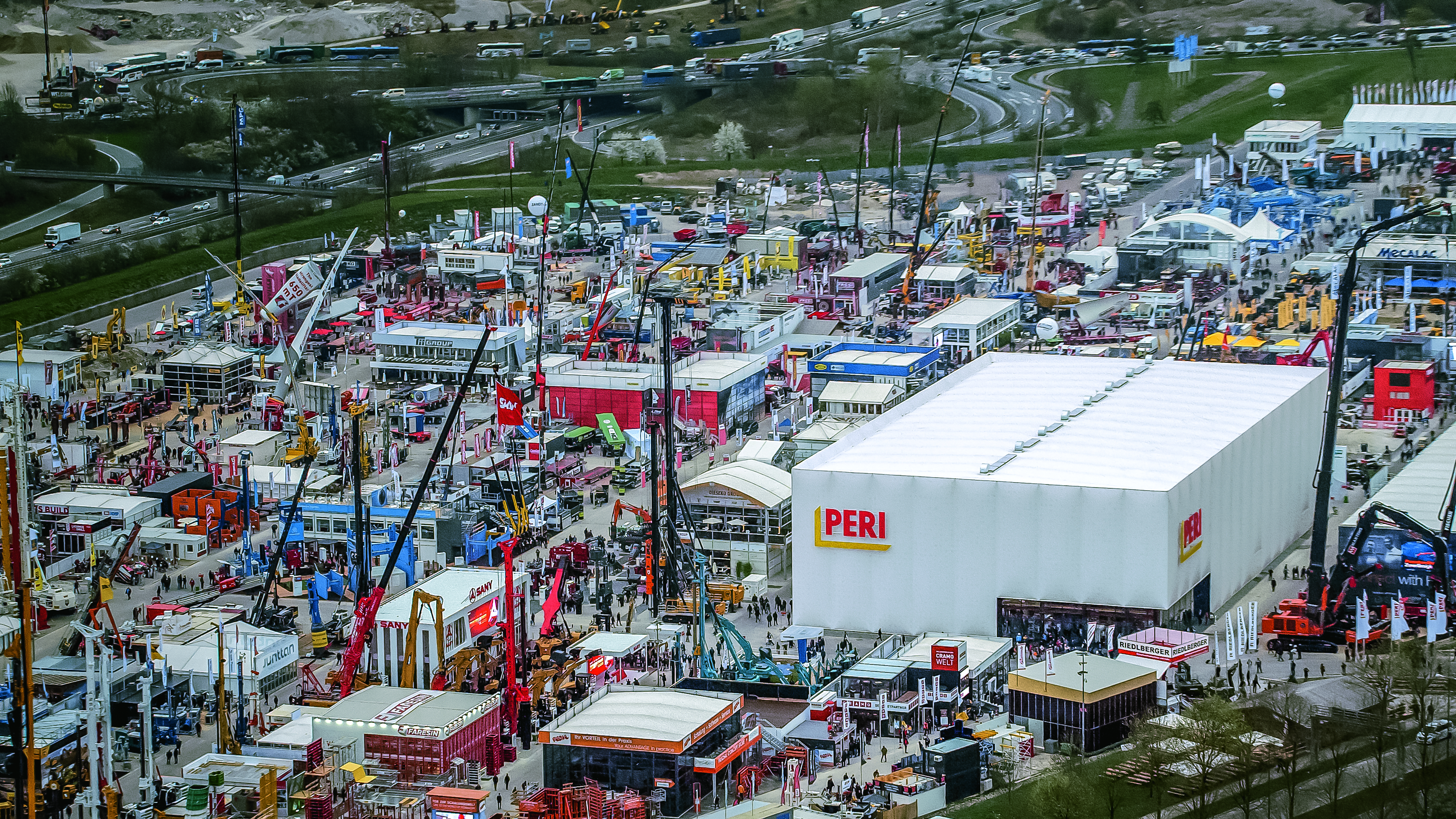
Bauma trade fair 2019, Munich

The past Bauma edition, which took place from April 11 to 17, 2016, attracted 3,425 exhibitors from 58 countries (2013: 3,421 exhibitors; 2010: 3,256 exhibitors) and 583,736 visitors from 219 countries (2013: approximately 535,065; 2010: approximately 420,170). The exhibition space was 605,000 m² (2013: 575,000 m²; 2010: 555,000 m²).

== Exhibitors ==
Both German and foreign suppliers of machinery and vehicles for construction and mining exhibit at the fair. The trade fair comprises four sectors. The "All around construction sites" sector includes suppliers of construction vehicles, construction machinery, construction tools, lifting appliances, formwork and scaffoldings. The "Mining, extraction and processing of raw materials" exhibition sector brings together manufacturers of machines for extracting raw materials and mining, as well as those specialising in mineral processing technology. The "Production of building materials" sector comprises machines and plants for producing concrete, asphalt, clay and similar building materials. Drive technology, testing, measurement and control technology as well as accessories including services are presented in the "Components and service suppliers" sector. Numerous scale model manufacturers exhibit scale models of the construction equipment.

== See also ==
- EXCON, South Asia's largest trade fair
