= Messe München (site) =

Exhibition center in Munich

Coordinates: 48°08′08″N 11°41′55″E

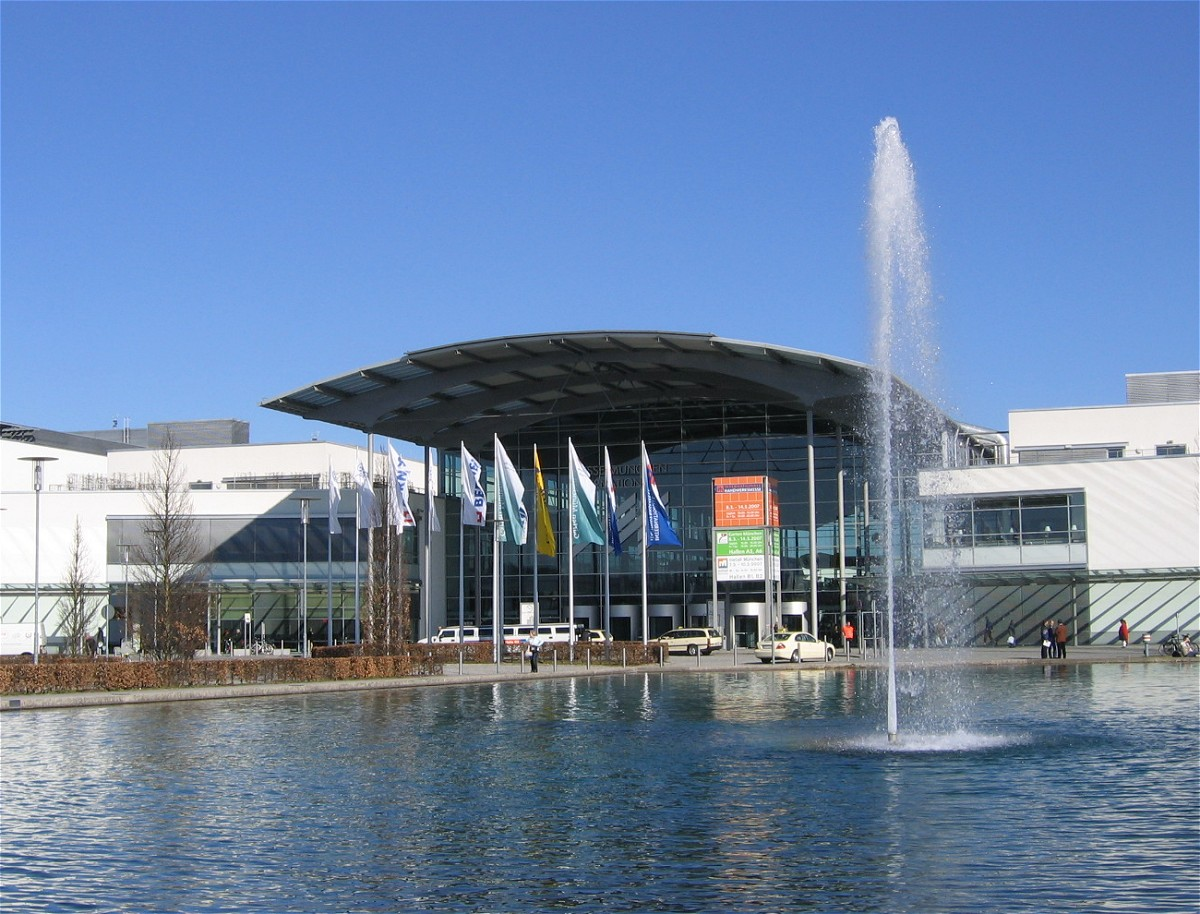
Western main entrance; at the forefront of the Messesee

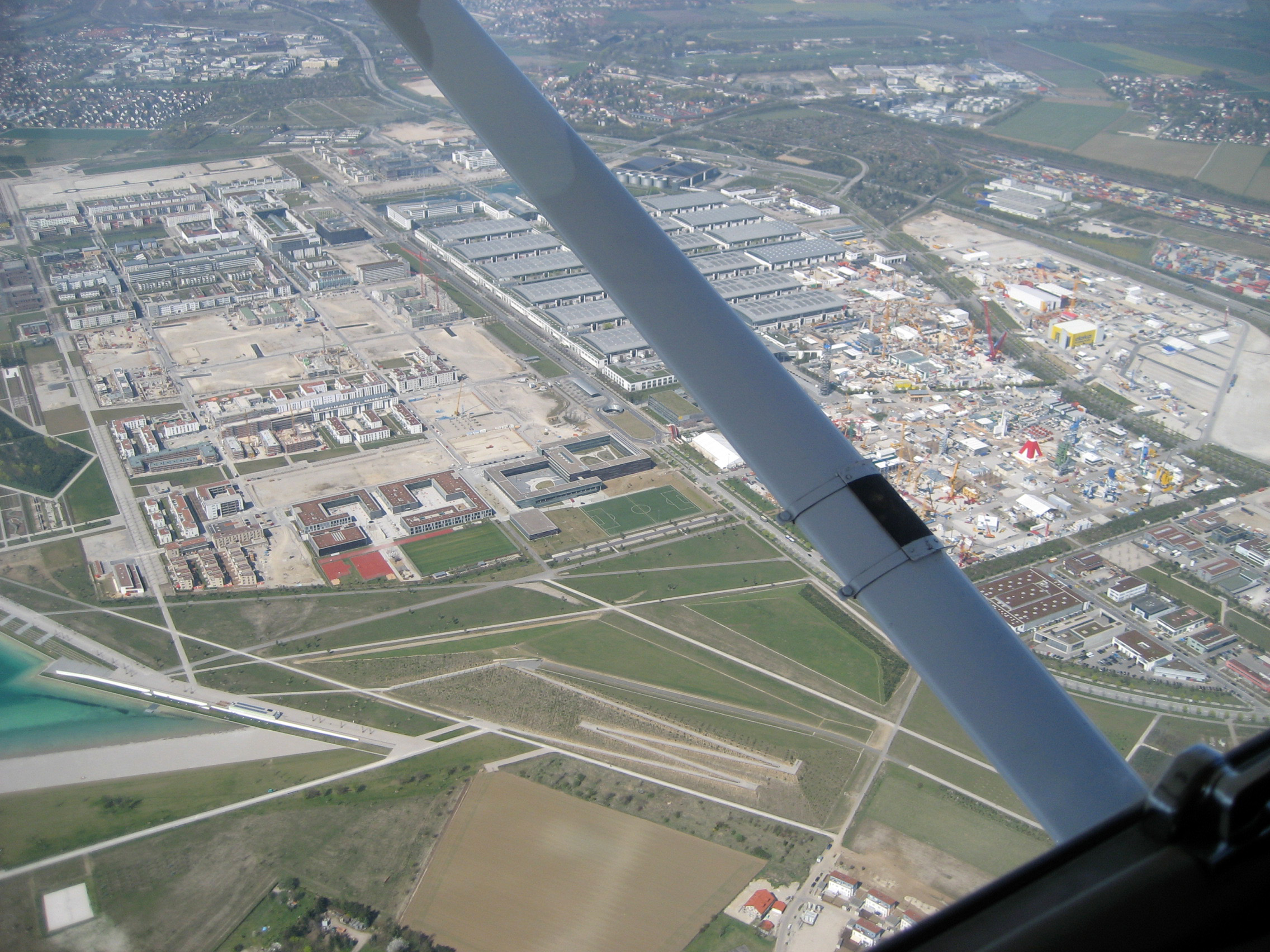
Aerial view of the exhibition center, the exhibition center is located in the upper right half of the picture

Messe München is a trade fair center in the Messestadt Riem area in the eastern district of Munich Trudering-Riem built from 1994 to 1998. It is operated by Messe München GmbH.

== Location and transport ==
The exhibition center was built on the northern half of the former Munich-Riem airport. It is bordered by the south Willy-Brandt-Allee and the residential development of Riem Messestadt and Riem arcades, there are also the two underground stations for the U2 line, Messestadt West and East located there. The Bundesautobahn 94 passes to the north and the exhibition grounds are connected with two highway exits. Further north is the S-Bahn station in Munich-Riem, where the transportation of freight to the fairgrounds runs since 2001. A direct connection of the S-Bahn to the fairgrounds is being discussed throughout the course of the construction of the Erding Ring Closure, which would also allow for a direct connection to the new Munich Airport.

== Terrain and buildings ==
The heart of the exhibition grounds are 16 exhibition halls with a total of 180,000 m^{2} (1,900,000 sq ft) of exhibition space with the added, when needed, additional 360,000 m^{2} (3,900,000 sq ft) of open area to the north and east of the site. The two main entrances are located on the western and eastern end, these are connected by a 650 m (2,130 ft) long and 35 m-wide (115 ft) atrium, which allow access to the twelve halls. Located at the western entrance is the International Congress Centre (ICM), the exhibition hall and the Messesee. An 86-meter-high (282 ft) fair tower stands at the eastern entrance. Architects were Bystrup Architecture Design Engineering, Bregenhøj + Partners, Kaup, Scholz, Jesse + Partner. At the third entrance, to the north, a press center with the World Cup fountain was established for the 2006 FIFA World Cup, it has since been used by Messe München. Upon the completion of construction, the world's largest photovoltaic system was installed on the roof of the exhibition halls. The system produces about 1,000 MWh of electricity annually. At the north-eastern and south-western end of the show, there are two parking garages with a total of about 5,700 parking spaces. The outdoor area is used as additional parking space or additional exhibition space for major fairs, such as Bauma.

In May 2016 two more halls will be built northeast of the existing building. The €93 million expansion should have been started as early as 2013 according to the Messe München GmbH, but its shareholders, the city of Munich and Bavaria, requested an extension.

== Messesee ==
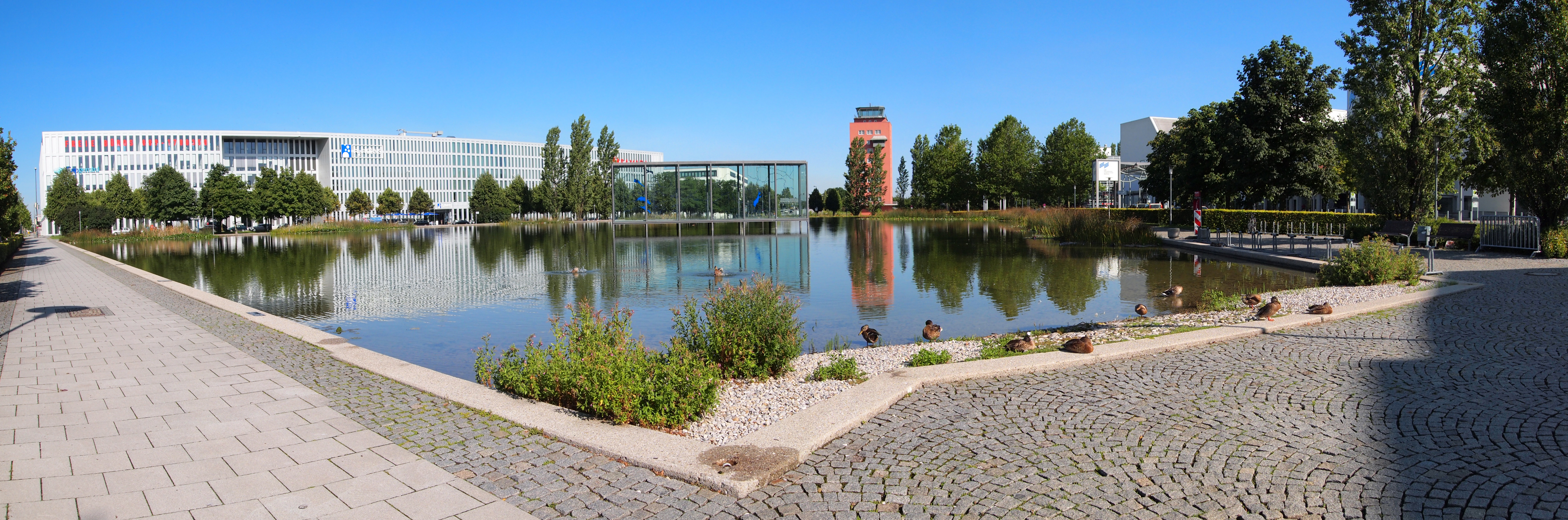
View of the Messesee, in the background of the old airport tower

West of the exhibition halls – between the former airport tower in the north and the metro station Messestadt West and the Willy-Brandt-Platz in the south – the 390 m-long (1,280 ft) and 46-to-94 m-wide (151-to-308 ft) Messesee is located with a water area of 2.6 ha (6.4 acres). It is separated in the middle, creating a northern and southern part, by a causeway that runs to the main entrance. The road "Am Messesee" runs across the causeway as an extension of Joseph-Wild-Straße, it is used during trade fairs as an entrance taxis. The lake flows to the north of the causeway over one sheet pile, and to the south over two, so that a continuous flow of water is achieved; as a result, three water fountains which are in operation in the summer months, are located in pools. At the northern end the water runs a stone-filled infiltration basin. The banks are partially overgrown with reeds. At the entrance to the fair, the two-part installation Gran Paradiso from the Munich artist Stephan Huber, stands in the water since 1997.

== Literature ==
- Hesse, Roland (1998). Messe München – Entwurf, Planung, Realistation (in German). Munich: Prestel Verlag. ISBN 3-7913-1968-X.
