= Internationales Congress Center München =

German international Congress Center

Coordinates: 48.1368°N 11.6929°E

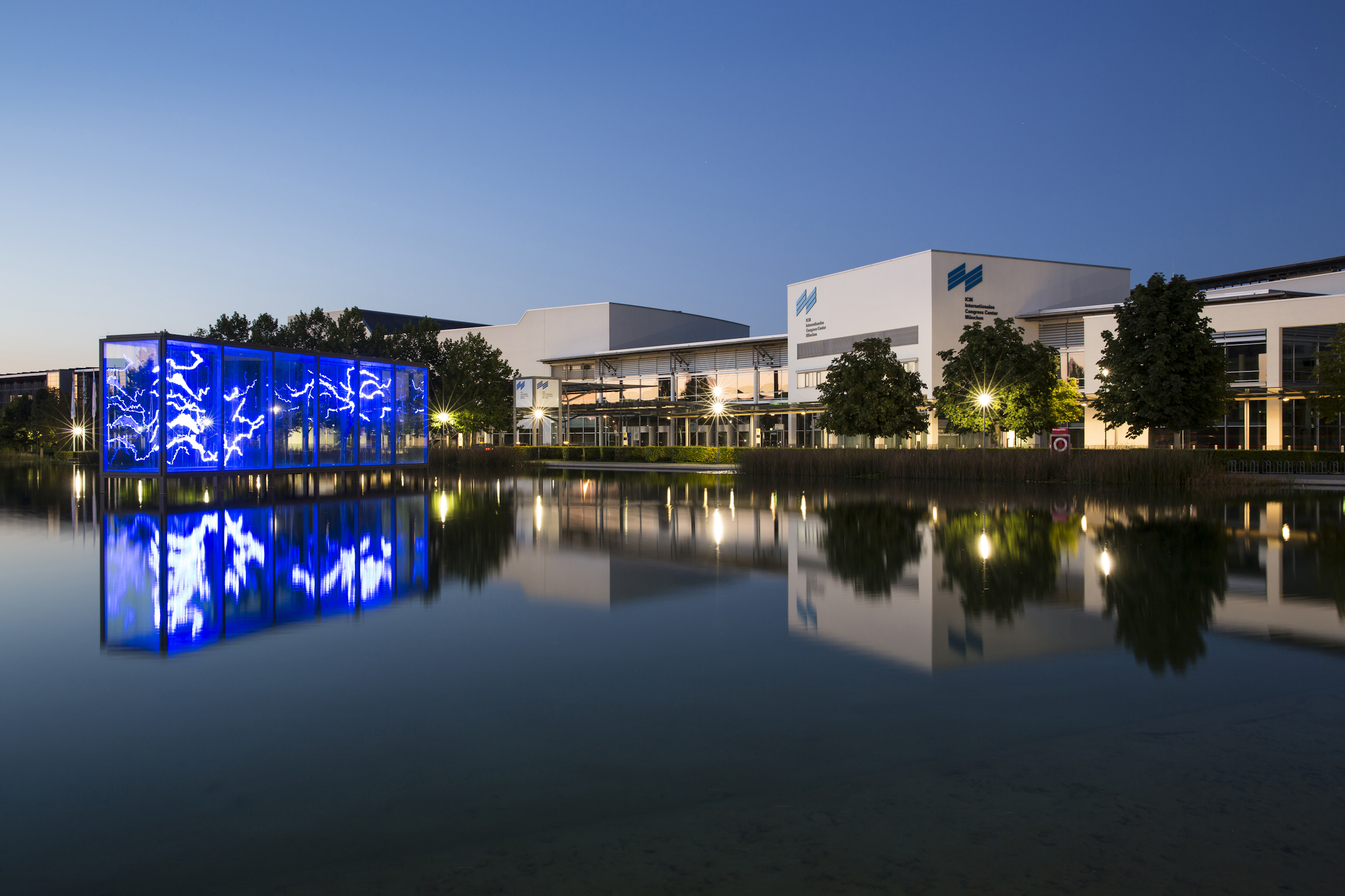
Exterior view at ICM

The convention center ICM–Internationales Congress Center München belongs to Messe München. It is structurally integrated into the exhibition center in Munich's Messestadt Riem and has been operating since 1998 together with Messe München. International medical and scientific congresses, general meetings of listed companies as well as events take place in the ICM. Since 2011, the ICM operates together with Messe München and the MOC Veranstaltungscenter München as the Messe München Locations.

== Premises ==
The convention center has an available exhibition space of 7,000 m^{2}. The 20 halls of the ICM can accommodate events with up to 6,000 people, and with the Messe München, the ICM provides space for events for tens of thousands of participants.

== Technology and service ==
The infrastructure in the ICM include high-speed communication technology, modern lighting and sound equipment, audiovisual, transmission and stage equipment with movable stage areas and lighting grids and permanent interpretation booths. The convention center also has three restaurant areas.

== Events ==
The customers of the ICM include international organizations and large corporations as well as agencies. The most visited medical congress in the ICM and on the fairgrounds, with over 30,000 participants, is the Congress of the European Society of Cardiology (ESC), which has been held every four years since 2004. DAX companies such as MAN SE, Munich Re and The Linde Group organize their annual general meetings for many years now in the ICM.

== Memberships ==
The ICM is a member of various industry associations, including the Europäischer Verband der Veranstaltungs-Centren (EVVC), the German Convention Bureau (GCB) and the Association Internationale des Palais de Congrès (AIPC).
