= Productronica =

Trade fair for electronics manufacturing

productronica
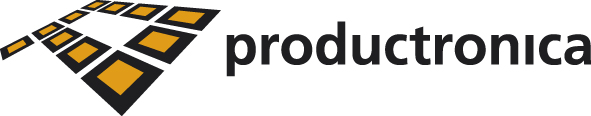
- Status: Active
- Genre: Electronics Manufacturing
- Venue: Munich Trade Fair Centre
- Location: Munich
- Country: Germany
- Inaugurated: 1975
- Most recent: 2017
- Attendance: 44,000 (2017)
- Organizer: Messe München (MMG)
- Website: www.productronica.com

productronica is a trade fair for electronics manufacturing that has been held in Munich every two years since 1975. It takes place at the Munich Trade Fair Centre in the borough of Riem. productronica's conceptual sponsor is the Productronics Association of VDMA (German Engineering Federation), and the fair is a key component in the network of electronics trade fairs organized by Messe München.

productronica takes place in mid-November during all uneven-numbered years, alternating each year with the trade fair electronica, and it occupies an average of ten exhibition halls. A series of technical conferences addressing the electronics industry is held in Munich at the same time as the fair.

== History ==
productronica – a spinoff of electronica, one of the electronics industry's largest trade fairs in the world – was established as an independent trade fair in 1975. Ever since, it has given the production sector of the electronics industry its own comprehensive platform. The fair focuses on the entire value chain in electronics production.

== productronica's exhibition sectors ==
productronica's exhibition sectors have developed continuously since 1975. The fair's primary sectors have always been as follows:

- PCB and circuit-carrier manufacturing
- Component-mount technology
- Technologies in cable processing
- Soldering technology
- Test and measurement, quality assurance

However, the fair's product index also includes the following topics:

- Hybrid component manufacturing
- Materials processing, LED manufacturing and discrete components
- Coilware manufacturing
- Production and processing software
- Product finishing
- Production logistics and material-flow technology
- Electronic manufacturing services (EMS)
- Production subsystems
- Operating materials and equipment, environmental technology
- Services
- Photovoltaic manufacturing
- Battery and energy-storage manufacturing
- Organic and printed electronics, polytronics
- Semiconductor and display manufacturing
- Micro/nano production

== The fair and its visitors ==
In 2017, productronica had 1,560 exhibitors and additionally represented companies and 77,000 m^{2} of exhibition space. 49 percent of the exhibiting companies were from countries other than Germany. On the visitors' side, 44,000 professionals made their way to the Munich Trade Fair Centre. 42 percent of them were from Germany, and the remaining 58 percent were from abroad. Of them, 64 percent came from countries in Europe. According to the visitor profile, visitors predominantly represented the production (20%), management (19%) and research and development (18%) sectors.

== productronica innovation award ==
The winners of the productronica innovation award were announced on November 14, the first day of the 2017 fair. An independent panel of judges selected the most innovative products and solutions from the nearly 60 that were submitted.

== productronica around the world ==
productronica is a key component in the network of electronics trade fairs organized by Messe München. This network includes the leading international trade fairs electronica and productronica at the trade-fair center in Munich as well as regional exhibitions in China and India. All in all, more than 7,500 exhibitors and more than 260,000 visitors take part in events that are part of the MMI network of trade fairs for the electronics sector.
