= Electronica (trade fair) =

German electronics industry trade fair

Official logo

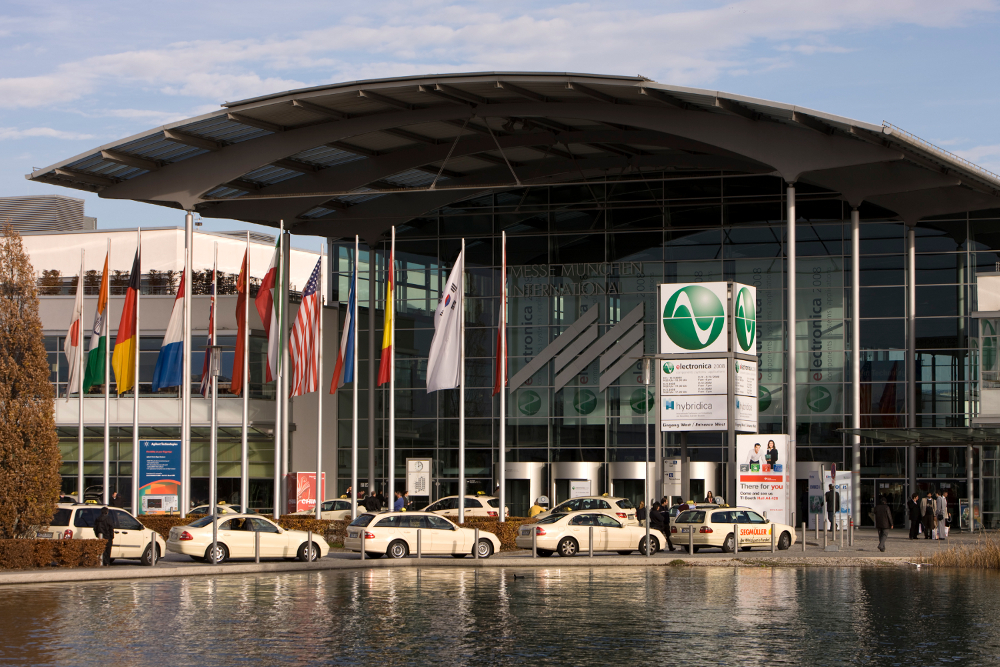
The Neue Messe München

Electronica (stylized as electronica) is a trade fair for the electronics industry. The exhibitors who participate in it present electronic components, systems, applications and services.

== Overview ==
Organized by Messe München, Electronica has been held at the Messe München trade-fair center every other year in November (alternating with productronica) since 1964. The 2020 edition was held online due to the COVID pandemic.

== Electronica embedded and Electronica automotive ==
Electronica places special emphasis on automotive and vehicle electronics and on the sectors for embedded hardware and software with two special exhibition sectors, i.e. “electronica automotive” and “electronica embedded”. Besides the exhibition areas at the fair itself, electronica also features the “automotive Forum”, the “electronica automotive conference” and the “embedded Forum” as additional event platforms for visitors and exhibitors in these sectors. For the first time ever, the 2012 fair also featured the new “embedded platforms conference” which addressed embedded-systems engineers who could gather information about selecting the right platform for their needs.

== Additional conferences and forums ==
The trade fair Electronica is accompanied by an extensive program of related events. Besides the above-mentioned forums and conferences for automotive and vehicle electronics and embedded hardware and software they mainly include the following events:

- “Wireless Congress”: The congress addresses developers, system designers, technology decision-makers, project managers and government agencies in the sector for wireless systems. It is organized by Electronica in conjunction with Weka Fachmedien GmbH and ZVEI.
- “electronica Forum”: During the four days of the trade fair lectures and discussion panels on current topics of the industry are taking place at the electronica forum. The themes range from new technologies and market developments to overall topics like education and training.
- “PCB & Components Market Place”: The PCB & Components Market Place is a forum for lectures and discussions about semiconductors, other circuit carriers and EMS.
- “CEO Round Table”: The panel discussion with international managing directors and CEOs examines the latest topics of interest to the industry. It is organized by Messe München GmbH.

The trade fair is also rounded out by several other panel discussions, lectures and conferences.

== Electronica around the world ==
Besides Electronica in Munich, Messe München International also organizes other international trade fairs for the electronics industry abroad such as Electronic Asia (stylized as electronic Asia) in Hong Kong, Electronica China (stylized as electronica China) and productronica China in Shanghai, and Electronica India (stylized as electronica India) and productronica India (alternating between Bangalore and New Delhi).

== Electronica 2016 ==
Electronica 2016 was held in Munich, Germany from the 8 to 11 of November 2016.

== Electronica India 2017 ==
Electronica India 2017 was held in New Delhi, at Pragati Maidan India from the September 14 to 16, 2017.

== Electronica India 2018 ==
Electronica India 2018 was held in Bengaluru, at BIEC India from the September 26 to 28, 2018.
