= Trudering-Riem =

Borough of Munich, Germany

Trudering-Riem Trudaring-Ream (Central Bavarian)
- Borough of Munich
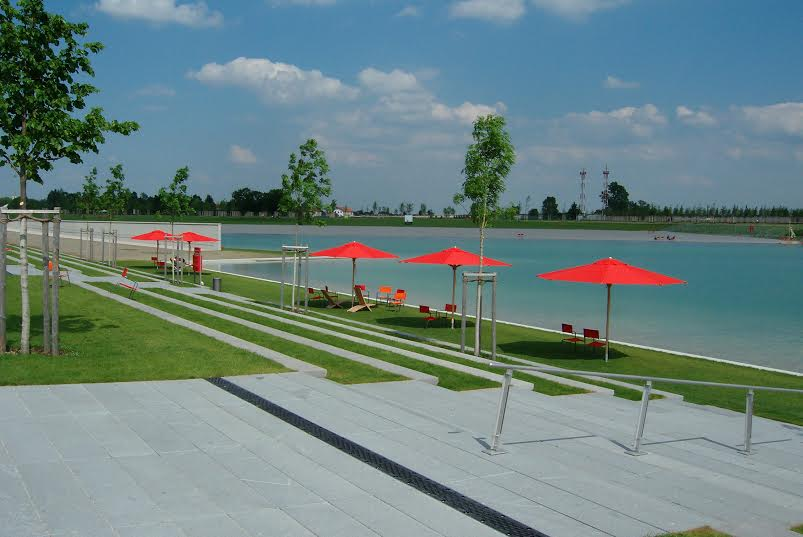
- Riemer Park

- Location of Trudering-Riem within Munich
- Interactive map of Trudering-Riem
- Location within Germany Location within Bavaria
- Coordinates: 48°07′00″N 11°39′30″E
- Country: Germany
- State: Bavaria
- Admin. region: Upper Bavaria
- District: Urban district
- City: Munich
- Founded: 772
  - Mayor: (SPD)

Area
  - Total: 22.4 km^{2} (8.6 sq mi)

Population (2023-12-31)
  - Total: 75,728
  - Density: 3,380/km^{2} (8,760/sq mi)
- Time zone: UTC+01:00 (CET)
  - Summer (DST): UTC+02:00 (CEST)
- Postal codes: 81735, 81825, 81827, 81829
- Dialling codes: 089
- Website: stadt.muenchen.de

Trudering-Riem (German pronunciation: [ˈtʁuːdəʁɪŋ ˈʁiːm]; Central Bavarian: Trudaring-Ream) is the 15th borough (German: Stadtbezirk) of Munich, Bavaria. It consists of the two quarters (German: Stadtteile) Trudering and Riem. The borough is the location of Munich's former airport, Riem Airport.

== Location ==
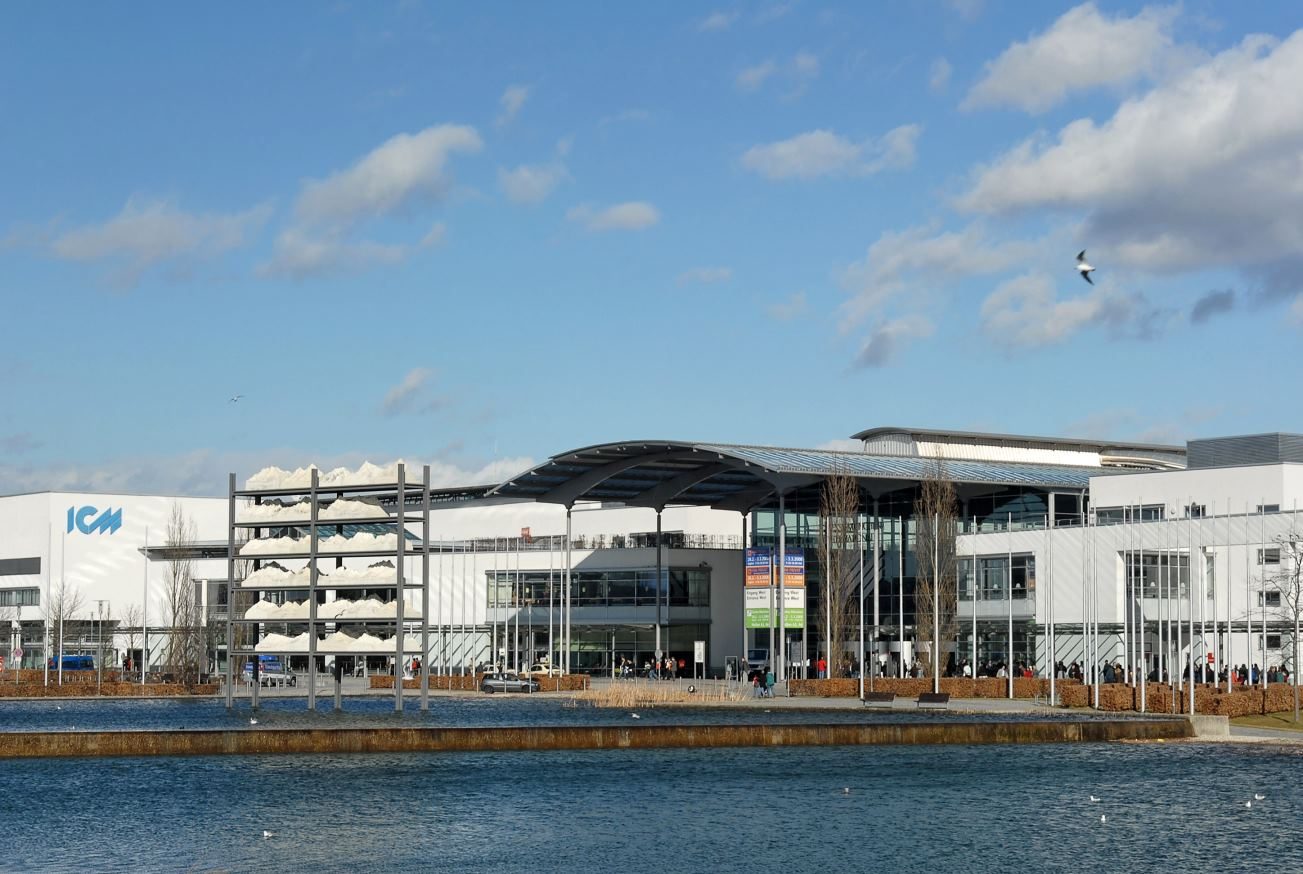
Messe Riem

In the north the borough borders Bogenhausen, in the west the borough borders Berg am Laim, in the south Ramersdorf-Perlach, and in the east the municipalities Aschheim, Feldkirchen, Haar and Putzbrunn (belonging to the Munich district).

The population is distributed roughly as follows: Trudering 56,000 and Riem 20,000.

There are the following subdistricts:

- Gartenstadt Trudering
- Kirchtrudering
- Messestadt Riem
- Moosfeld
- Neutrudering
- Riem
- Straßtrudering
- Waldtrudering

The old village center of Riem is situated around the church of St. Martin that lies in the street Martin-Empl-Ring. The old village center of Kirchtrudering is situated around the church St. Peter and Paul in the Kirchtruderinger Straße and the one of Straßtrudering at the junction of Truderinger Straße and Bajuwarenstraße.

The municipality of Trudering was formed in 1818 by merging the villages of Kirchtrudering and Straßtrudering. At the beginning of the 20th century, new settlements emerged in the municipal area, such as Gartenstadt (garden city) Trudering, Waldtrudering and Neutrudering. Trudering has been part of Munich since 1932, and Riem since 1937.

== Literature ==
- Willibald Karl (Hrsg.), Karl Bachmaier u. a.: Trudering, Waldtrudering, Riem. Münchens ferner Osten. Volk Verlag, München 2003, ISBN 3-937200-06-1.
- Stadtbezirk Trudering-Riem – Informationen für Bürger und Gäste. WEKA-Verlag, Mering 2004, OCLC 76558831. (online im Webarchiv, PDF; 1,5 MB)
- Brückl, Josef: 1200 Jahre Trudering. Festausgabe zur zwölfhundertjährigen Wiederkehr der ersten urkundlichen Erwähnung. Mit handschriftlicher Widmung vom Autor. Emil Biehl & Söhne (Gesamtherstellung), München 1972.

== Statistics ==
(As of each 31 December, residents whose main residence)

Year	Residents	Area (ha)	ppl./ha	Source and further details
2000	42.996	2245,39	19	Statistisches Taschenbuch München 2001 (PDF)
2001	45.403	2245,39	20	Statistisches Taschenbuch München 2002 (PDF)
2019	73.206	2245,05	33	
