= Riem Arcaden =

Coordinates: 48°07′55″N 11°41′31″E

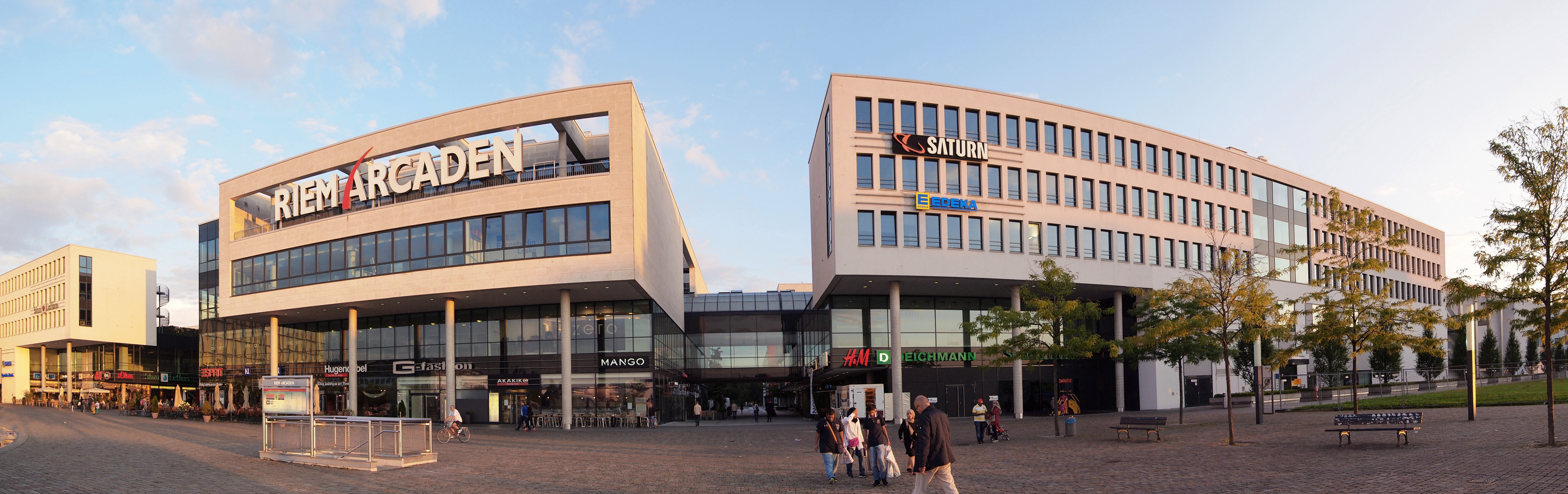
- Location: Messestadt Riem, Munich, Germany
- Address: Willy-Brandt-Platz 5, 81829 München
- Opened: 10 March 2004
- Developer: Mfi Management für Immobilien
- Owner: Union Investment
- Architect: Allmann Sattler Wappner
- Num. of stores: >140
- Floor area: 61,100 m^{2}
- Floors: 3
- Parking: 2,700
- Website: www.riemarcaden.de

The Riem Arcaden is the largest shopping mall in Munich. It was built in the Messestadt Riem district at Willy-Brandt-Platz and designed by the Allmann Sattler Wappner firm and opened on 10 March 2004.

The 122,500 m² building complex of the Riem Arcaden city quarter offers space for over 140 shops, cafés and restaurants on three floors and around 61,100 m² of retail space.

In addition to various fashion brands - such as Marc O'Polo or Tommy Hilfiger (company)- technical novelties, sports equipment, accessories, toys and home décor, doctors, a pharmacy, hairdressers, beauty salons as well as a dry cleaner and alteration tailor are also available for the approximately 9 million visitors each year.

On the upper floor there are several cafés surrounded by shops such as Hugendubel, Müller and Zara.

== Food court ==
In the middle of the ground floor, a food court, includes restaurant chains such as Nordsee and McDonald's and other restaurants. The food on offer ranges from Indian and Vietnamese to Italian and Bavarian dishes.

== Local supply ==
Initially, no other shops or supermarkets were planned for the new Messestadt Riem district created in 1999. For this reason, in addition to its regional importance as a major shopping centre, the Riem Arcaden also played the role of a daily local supplier for an entire district for some time. The lower floor therefore houses many smaller shops as well as shops for daily needs such as Edeka (with a postal agency) and Aldi.

== Social responsibility ==
Numerous events in and around the shopping centre serve as a meeting place for visitors and residents alike. Together with local schools, kindergartens and social initiatives, the Riem Arcaden are involved in various charitable projects.

== Riem Arcaden City Quarter ==
Around 26,000 people visit each day. The centre's car park has 2,700 parking spaces and a valeting service. Electric car charging stations are provided. In addition to the mall, the Riem Arcaden city quarter offers 30,000 m² of office space, 62 flats and a Novotel hotel with around 278 rooms and a Motel One hotel which has 310 rooms.

== Transport ==
Riem Arcades can be accessed via Bundesautobahn 94 and the U-Bahn station Messestadt-West (right outside the main entrance). underground line U2, bus lines 139, 189, 190, 234, 263 and 264 also stop there.
