= Munich-Riem Airport =

Former airport of Munich, Bavaria, Germany (1939–1992)

Munich-Riem Airport Flughafen München-Riem
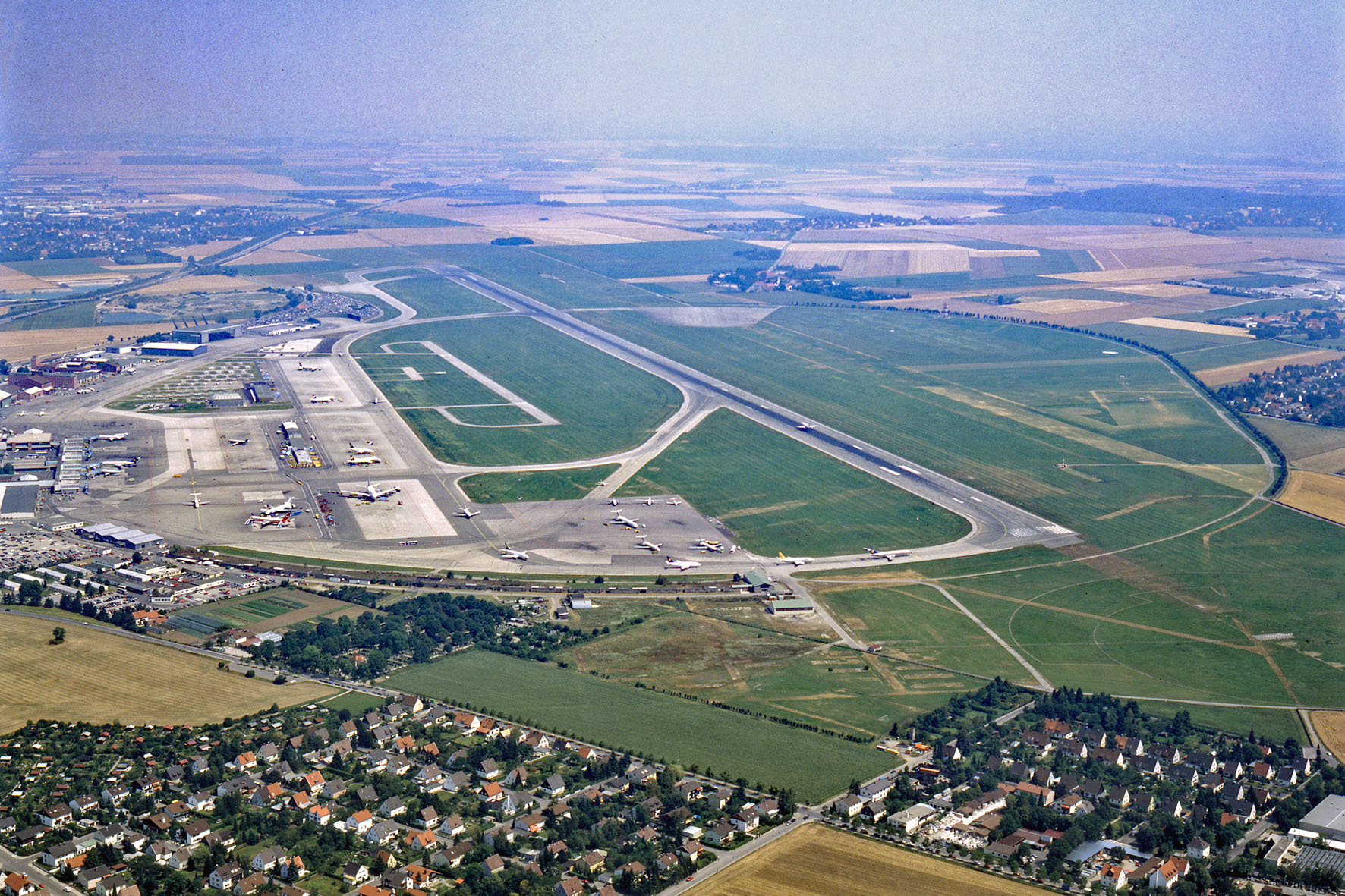
- Munich-Riem Airport in 1988.
- IATA: MUC; ICAO: EDDM

Summary
- Airport type: Defunct
- Owner/Operator: Flughafen München GmbH
- Serves: Munich
- Location: Trudering-Riem, Bavaria
- Opened: 25 October 1939
- Closed: 16 May 1992
- Hub for: Lufttransport Süd (1983–1992)
- Coordinates: 48°08′16″N 011°41′25″E

Map
- Location within Bavaria

Runways
Direction	Length		Surface
Direction	m	ft	Surface
07R/25L	2,804	9,199	Concrete (Closed)
07L/25R	814	2,671	Concrete (Closed)

Munich-Riem Airport (IATA: MUC, ICAO: EDDM) was an international airport of Munich, the capital of Bavaria and third-largest city of Germany. It was closed down on 16 May 1992, the day before the new Munich Airport commenced operations. It was located near the old village of Riem in the borough of Trudering-Riem on the eastern side of Munich.

The area has been redeveloped into Messestadt Riem, a new urban district consisting of housing projects, a shopping mall, recreational areas and the Neue Messe München, an exhibition and convention center.

== History ==
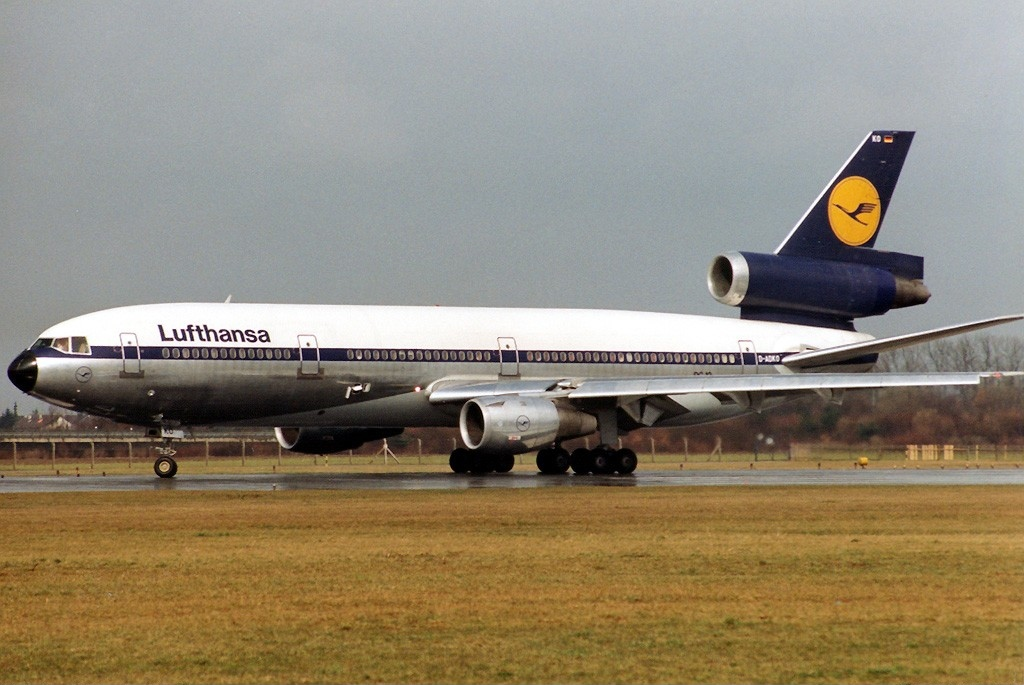
Lufthansa McDonnell Douglas DC-10-30 in Riem 1989

=== Foundation and expansion ===
Construction started in 1936. The first plane landed on 25 October 1939, signalling the beginning of air traffic. At this time it was one of the most modern airports in the world. It replaced the airfield at Oberwiesenfeld (now the site of the Olympic Village).

In World War II it was home to Adolf Galland's legendary Jagdverband 44. It was almost completely destroyed by bombings on 9 April 1945. Until that day, civilian air traffic had also been handled in Riem. George Raffeld of the United States Rainbow Division was the first of the allied forces to arrive at the airport. He reported to his superior officers that the airport had been abandoned by the Germans.

After the war Munich-Riem was the first airport in Germany to be used for civil aviation. Post-war operations started on 6 April 1948 with the landing of a DC-3 operated by Pan American World Airways. On 12 October 1949 the Flughafen München-Riem GmbH (Munich-Riem Airport Ltd.) was founded. Wulf-Dieter Graf zu Castell became one of its managing directors. The airport's runway was lengthened to 1,900 metres (6,234 ft) in November 1949.

On 29 October 1958, the first jet aircraft, a Sud Aviation Caravelle operated by Air France, landed on the runway that had been lengthened by further 700 metres (2,297 ft). In 1962 more than one million passengers had passed through the airport. As early as 1963, the Öchsle Commission initiated a search for a new airport location as it was obvious that further extension would not be legally or politically possible. Constructing additional runways parallel or perpendicular to the existing one would require relocating a number of nearby communities. A number of accidents further encouraged the decision to build a new airport further away from the city and to close down Riem. In October 1965, a new maintenance hangar for jets that had been built at a cost of DM 10 million was put into operation and transferred to Lufthansa. In 1969 the Flughafen München-Riem GmbH was renamed Flughafen München GmbH. The main runway (07R/25L) was upgraded to its final length of 2,804 metres (9,199 ft) after it was closed for resurfacing for three weeks in August 1969. In 1971 a new arrivals hall was put into operation, the passenger throughput having attained four million. On 31 December 1972 the long-time managing director Wulf-Dieter Graf zu Castell retired.

=== Later years and replacement ===
In the 1980s early 1990s, the airport was heavily congested. Originally, the terminal was intended to handle between five and eight million passengers per year, but by 1991 the passenger numbers had skyrocketed to twelve million passengers per year, which was 50% to more than double the number of passengers that the airport was originally designed to handle. Because the airport's taxiway system had been designed to be used as a smaller medium-size airport, it was unable to handle the large numbers of aircraft that used the airport. To continue operations, preliminary annexes to the terminal were built, including a special hall for charter flights.

During the night of 16-17 May 1992, operations moved to the new location near Freising. The IATA airport code MUC and the ICAO airport code EDDM has been reassigned to the new Munich Airport.

== Redevelopment ==
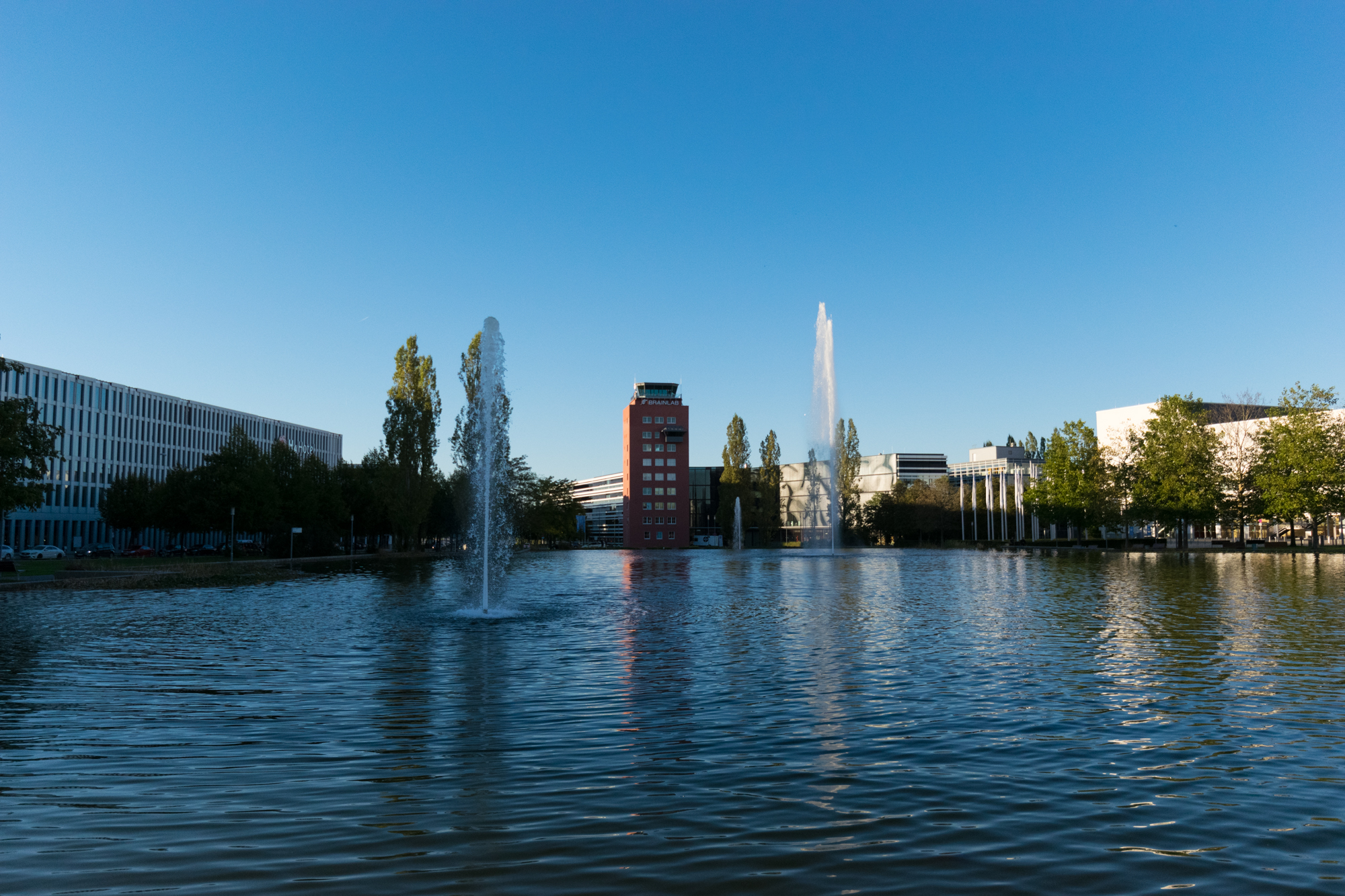
The remaining control tower surrounded by new buildings in 2018

=== Re-use as cultural center (1993–1996) ===
During an interim time after the move, the remaining terminal buildings, including Zeppelinhalle, Charterhalle, Terminal 1 and Wappensaal, were used as venues for large events such as concerts and raves. Riem was well known internationally in the techno, alternative, and rock scenes. One of the best-known events held during this interim cultural use was Nirvana's concert on 1 March 1994 at Terminal 1, which became the band's final live performance before the death of singer Kurt Cobain. On 17 June 1994, the Ultraschall techno club opened in what was the cafeteria's kitchen. The cultural centre was closed in the summer of 1996 because the area was to be redeveloped into the Messestadt Riem urban district.

=== Messestadt Riem ===
The redevelopment of the area into Messestadt Riem ("Riem Convention City") with an eponymous convention centre, apartment houses and parks was one of Munich's largest urban planning projects in the late 1990s and at the beginning of the 21st century. In 1999, the first residents moved into the new district. The only structures that remain of the airport today are the air traffic control tower and the original terminal building, the Wappenhalle ("hall of the coats of arms"). Both structures are protected monuments. A small stretch of the former runway still exists at the eastern end. In 2005, the former airport was the site of the Bundesgartenschau (Federal Horticultural Show).

== Accidents and incidents ==
- On 6 February 1958, an Airspeed AS 57 Ambassador charter plane crashed soon after take-off. The accident – known as the Munich air disaster – cost the lives of 23 people including eight football players from Manchester United. There were 21 survivors. The British pilot, James Thain, was initially blamed for the disaster after investigators claimed that ice on the wings had caused the take-off attempt to end in tragic failure. However, Thain was finally cleared of any responsibility for the crash in 1969, by which time he and his family had suffered numerous incidents of verbal abuse, hate mail and even death threats from people accusing him of causing the crash. The cause of the crash was ultimately established as slush on the runway; there had been no ice on the wings.
- On 17 December 1960, a Convair C-131D Samaritan operated by the United States Air Force crashed shortly after take-off, killing all 20 passengers and crew on board as well as 32 people on the ground. It is one of two confirmed crashes involving an airplane and a tramway.
