= Messestadt Riem =

Neighborhood in Munich, Germany

Coordinates: 48.1361°N 11.6986°E

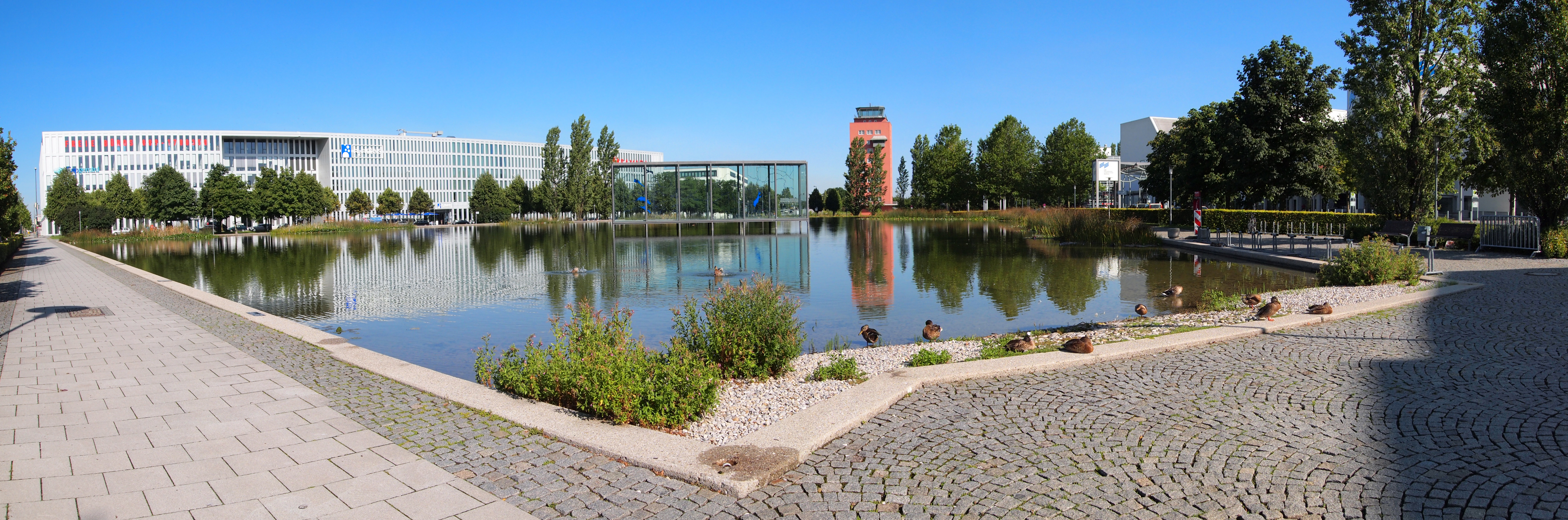
Messesee in Messestadt Riem

Messestadt Riem (literally: Convention City Riem; Central Bavarian: Messestod Ream) is an urban district in the east of Munich. It is part of the municipality 15 Trudering-Riem, and located entirely on the grounds of Munich-Riem airport, which closed in 1992 and now comprises a residential area, the Neue Messe München trade fair centre and the Riem Arcaden shopping mall.

== History ==
Messestadt Riem is, after Freiham, the second youngest district of Munich. After flight operations were moved in 1992 to the new Munich Airport, the old airport building in Riem closed and the construction of the new exhibition center started from the mid-1990s. Rapid transit connections were added later. In 1998, the fair moved out of its exhibition halls on the Theresienhöhe to the spacious new building in the Messestadt. Other companies also moved to the former airport grounds. To the west of the west entrance, a Messesee ('fair lake') was created, 390 m long (north-south) and 46 to 94 m wide (east-west), with a water area of 2.6 hectares.

The south of the site now includes rental apartments and condominiums. The Riem Arcaden, a shopping centre, many kindergartens and three primary schools are in the same area. Munich's first car-free living projects were established in the area in 1998.

The first multi-family passive house and the first multifamily zero-energy house in Munich were also built in the area.

== Riemer Park ==
South of the residential area is the Riemer Park. In 2005, the Bundesgartenschau was held here after Munich won the corresponding competition in 2000. For this purpose Riemer Park, a large landscaped park, was built in 2002. After the Bundesgartenschau Riemer Park, the third largest park in the city of Munich, was opened to the public as a recreation area. With enormous effort, a lake was created in its center, known under the name Buga Lake (officially Riemer lake). The lake is east to west 800 m long, 150 m wide, 10 ha in size, up to 18 m deep and contains 100,000 m^{3} of water. It is an upscale ground water reserve, which can also be used for bathing. Because the water table is too low in the area and also varies greatly seasonally, a concrete trough was applied and the three pumps, each pumping a constant 40 liters of water per second into the lake, stopping the water from accumulating and causing flooding in the basements of surrounding residential buildings, among other things a drain pipe was laid under the sea. On the east bank there is a beach, while on the west bank, where a pedestrian bridge leads over the lake, a sedimentation zone was created with aquatic plants. Located near the west bank is two more, shallow sedimentation basins with water plants that are only 1100 and 800 m^{2} in size.

== Churches ==
In 2005, in the West of Messestadt Riem, an ecumenical church center where the Protestant St. Sophia and the Catholic St. Florian churches were dedicated and opened.

== Transportation ==
Messestadt Riem is connected to two Munich U-Bahn rapid transport stations and bus lines 139, 186, 189, 190 and N74. Autobahn 94 passes to the north. Discussions are ongoing about a railway connection to Messestadt Riem as part of the Erding Ring Closure to the airport.
