= Theresienhöhe =

- district
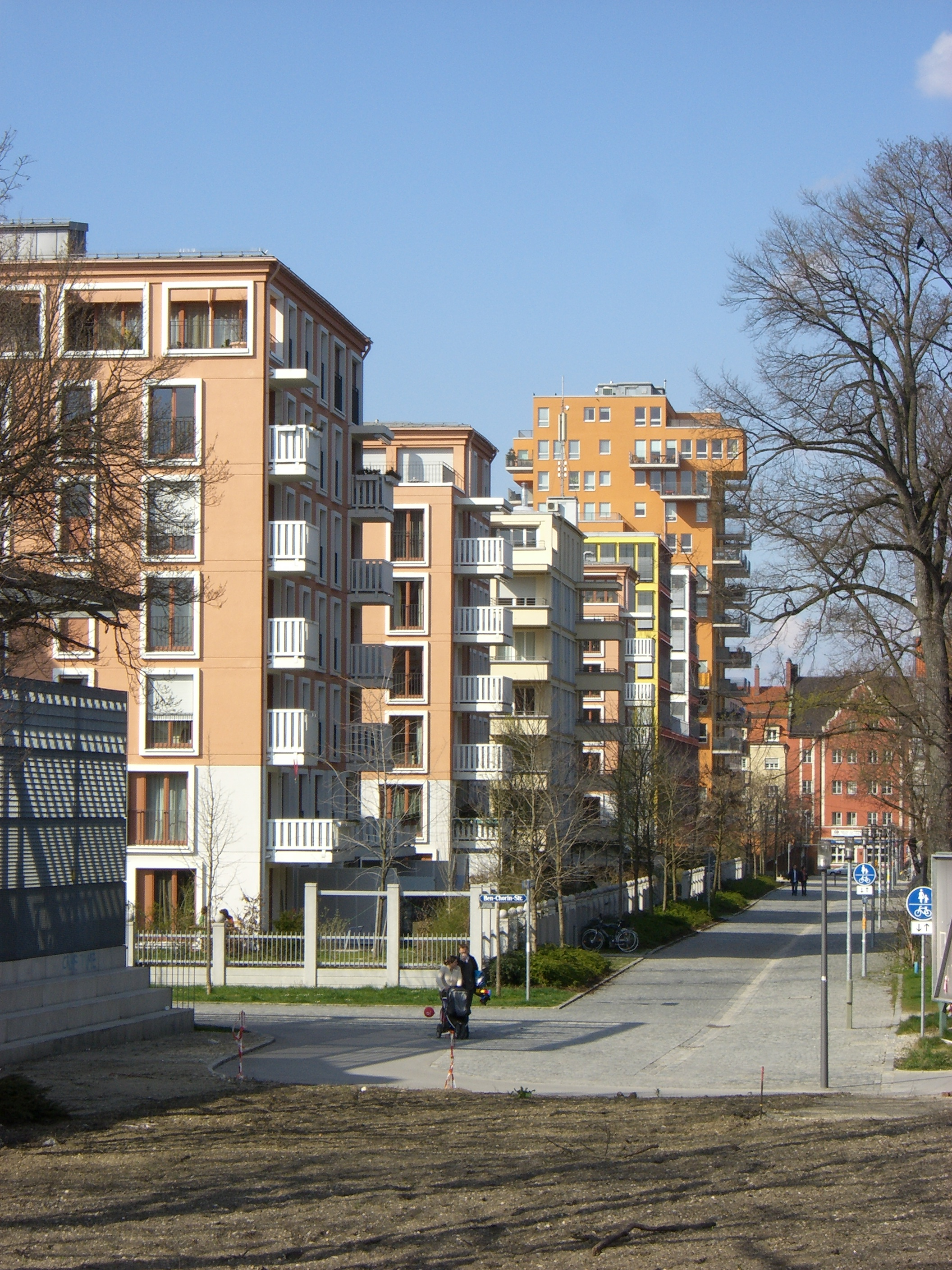

- Location within Bavaria
- Coordinates: 48°07′57″N 11°32′26″E

Theresienhöhe is a newly created quarter of Munich. It is part of Schwanthalerhöhe (city borough 8) and Sendling (city borough 6).

== History ==
From 1843 to 1853, the Bavaria with the Hall of Fame was built on the site above the Theresienwiese, according to the plans of Leo von Klenze. From 1900 Gabriel von Seidl developed the whole concept of an exhibition park, it was opened in 1908 on the occasion of the 750th anniversary of the city of Munich. A year later, an amusement park (which was later closed in 1934) was opened for summer use. In 1922, the site was used for the German trade show in Munich. For the 1972 Olympic Games, a wrestling hall was erected here. Until 1991, the exhibition center has gradually been extended and expanded to other halls.
